= List of Cyperus species =

As of November 2024, Plants of the World Online accepts 949 species in the genus Cyperus. Other species have since been considered synonyms, been newly described, or seem to have been omitted from the website database at the time. See references.

== A ==
- Cyperus abietinus (Goetgh.) Bauters
- Cyperus absconditicoronatus Bauters, Reynders & Goetgh.
- Cyperus acaulescens Reynders
- Cyperus acholiensis Larridon
- Cyperus acuminatus Torr. & Hook.
- Cyperus acuticarinatus Kük.
- Cyperus acutiusculus Lag.
- Cyperus aethiops Welw. ex Ridl.
- Cyperus affinis Roem. & Schult.
- Cyperus africanus (S.S.Hooper) Reynders
- Cyperus afro-occidentalis (Lye) Huygh
- Cyperus afroalpinus Lye
- Cyperus afrodunensis Lye
- Cyperus afroechinatus Lye
- Cyperus afromontanus Lye
- Cyperus afropumilus (Lye) Lye
- Cyperus afrorobustus Lye
- Cyperus afrovaricus Lye
- Cyperus aggregatus (Willd.) Endl.
- Cyperus ajax C.B.Clarke
- Cyperus alaticaulis R.Booth, D.J.Moore & Hodgon
- Cyperus alatus (Nees) F.Muell.
- Cyperus albescens (Steud.) Larridon & Govaerts
- Cyperus albiceps Ridl.
- Cyperus albogracilis (Lye) Lye
- Cyperus albopilosus (C.B.Clarke) Kük.
- Cyperus albopurpureus Cherm.
- Cyperus albosanguineus Kük.
- Cyperus albostriatus Schrad.
- Cyperus albus J.Presl & C.Presl
- Cyperus algeriensis Väre & Kukkonen
- Cyperus alleizettei (Cherm.) Kük.
- Cyperus almensis D.A.Simpson
- Cyperus alopecuroides Rottb.
- Cyperus alterniflorus R.Br.
- Cyperus alternifolius L.
- Cyperus altochrysocephalus Lye
- Cyperus altomicroglumis Lye
- Cyperus altsonii Kük.
- Cyperus alulatus J.Kern
- Cyperus alvesii G.C.Tucker
- Cyperus amabilis Vahl
- Cyperus amauropus Steud.
- Cyperus ampullaceus (J.Raynal) Bauters
- Cyperus × amuricocompressus T.Koyama
- Cyperus amuricus Maxim.
- Cyperus anderssonii Boeckeler
- Cyperus angolensis Boeckeler
- Cyperus angustatus R.Br.
- Cyperus anisitsii Kük.
- Cyperus ankaizinensis Cherm.
- Cyperus ankaratrensis Cherm.
- Cyperus antillanus (Kük.) O'Neill
- Cyperus appendiculatus (Brongn.) Kunth
- Cyperus aquatilis R.Br.
- Cyperus arenarius Retz.
- Cyperus aristulatus (Coville) Bauters
- Cyperus armstrongii Benth.
- Cyperus armstrongii Benth.
- Cyperus aromaticus (Ridl.) Mattf. & Kük.
- Cyperus arsenei O'Neill & Ben.Ayers
- Cyperus articulatus L.
- Cyperus aschenbornianus Boeckeler
- Cyperus ascocapensis Bauters
- Cyperus ascodensus Goetgh.
- Cyperus ascofibrillosus Goetgh.
- Cyperus ascohemisphaericus Goetgh.
- Cyperus asconeglectus Goetgh.
- Cyperus ascopinguis Goetgh.
- Cyperus ascopusillus Goetgh.
- Cyperus ascospinulosus Goetgh.
- Cyperus ascotrigonus Goetgh.
- Cyperus assimilis Steud.
- Cyperus astartodes K.L.Wilson
- Cyperus aster (C.B.Clarke ex Cherm.) Kük.
- Cyperus aterrimus Hochst. ex Steud.
- Cyperus atkinsonii C.B.Clarke
- Cyperus atractocarpus Ridl.
- Cyperus atriceps (Kük.) C.Archer & Goetgh.
- Cyperus atrobrunneus Baker
- Cyperus atronervatus Boeckeler
- Cyperus atrorubidus (Nelmes) Raymond
- Cyperus aucheri Jaub. & Spach
- Cyperus auratus (Nees) Huygh
- Cyperus aureoalatus Lye
- Cyperus aureobrunneus C.B.Clarke
- Cyperus aureospicatus Lock
- Cyperus aureostramineus Mattf. & Kük.
- Cyperus aureovillosus (Lye) Lye
- Cyperus auriculatus Nees & Meyen ex Kunth
- Cyperus aurifer Cherm.
- Cyperus austroafricanus C.Archer & Goetgh.
- Cyperus austrochrysanthus Lye

== B ==
- Cyperus babakan Steud.
- Cyperus bampsii Verloove & G.C.Tucker
- Cyperus baobab Lye
- Cyperus baoulensis Kük.
- Cyperus baronii C.B.Clarke
- Cyperus barrosianus Herter
- Cyperus beentjei L.R.Gardner & O.Weber
- Cyperus bellus Kunth
- Cyperus benadirensis Chiov.
- Cyperus beninensis (Samain, Reynders & Goetgh.) Huygh
- Cyperus bernalii G.C.Tucker & Verloove
- Cyperus bernieri Cherm.
- Cyperus berroi (C.B.Clarke) Barros
- Cyperus betafensis Cherm.
- Cyperus betchei (Kük.) S.T.Blake
- Cyperus beyrichii (Schrad. ex Nees) Steud.
- Cyperus bifax C.B.Clarke
- Cyperus bifolius Lye
- Cyperus bigibbosa Fosberg
- Cyperus bipartitus Torr.
- Cyperus blakeanus K.L.Wilson
- Cyperus blastophorus (Cherm.) Kük.
- Cyperus blatteri (McCann) Wad.Khan
- Cyperus blepharoleptos Steud.
- Cyperus blysmoides Hochst. ex C.B.Clarke
- Cyperus bonariensis G.C.Tucker
- Cyperus boreobellus Lye
- Cyperus boreochrysocephalus Lye
- Cyperus boreohemisphaericus Lye
- Cyperus bowmanni F.Muell. ex Benth.
- Cyperus bracheilema (Steud.) Mattf. & Kük.
- Cyperus brasiliensis (Kunth) Bauters
- Cyperus breedlovei G.C.Tucker
- Cyperus breviculmis R.Br.
- Cyperus brevifolioides Thieret & Delahouss.
- Cyperus brevifolius (Rottb.) Hassk.
- Cyperus breviglumis Lye
- Cyperus brumadoi D.A.Simpson
- Cyperus brunneoalatus (Cherm.) Huygh
- Cyperus brunneoalbus (Lye) Lye
- Cyperus brunneofibrosus Lye
- Cyperus brunnescens Boeckeler
- Cyperus brunneus Sw.
- Cyperus buchholzii Boeckeler
- Cyperus bulbipes Mattf. & Kük.
- Cyperus bulbosus Vahl
- Cyperus burkartii Guagl.
- Cyperus byssaceus Pereira-Silva

== C ==
- Cyperus caducus Steud.
- Cyperus caesius Boeckeler
- Cyperus calderoniae S.González
- Cyperus callistus Ridl.
- Cyperus camagueyensis Britton
- Cyperus camerunensis Lye
- Cyperus camphoratus Liebm.
- Cyperus cancellatus Ridl.
- Cyperus cancrorum Cherm.
- Cyperus canus J.Presl & C.Presl
- Cyperus capensis (Steud.) Endl.
- Cyperus capillifolius A.Rich.
- Cyperus capitatus Vand.
- Cyperus cardosoi (Meneses) Huygh
- Cyperus carinalaevis (Lye & Mesterházy) Huygh
- Cyperus carinatus R.Br.
- Cyperus cartilagineus (K.Schum.) Mattf. & Kük.
- Cyperus castaneobellus Lye
- Cyperus castaneus Willd.
- Cyperus cataphyllatus (Huygh & Schouppe) Huygh
- Cyperus cataractarum (C.B.Clarke) K.Schum. ex Engl.
- Cyperus cearaensis Gross ex Kük.
- Cyperus celans Kukkonen
- Cyperus cellulosoreticulatus Boeckeler
- Cyperus centralis K.L.Wilson
- Cyperus cephalanthus Torr. & Hook.
- Cyperus cephalotes Vahl
- Cyperus ceylanicus T.Koyama
- Cyperus chaetophyllus (Chiov.) Kük.
- Cyperus chalaranthus J.Presl & C.Presl
- Cyperus chamaecephalus Cherm.
- Cyperus chermezonianus Robyns & Tournay
- Cyperus chermezonii Kük.
- Cyperus chersinus (N.E.Br.) Kük.
- Cyperus chevalieri Kük.
- Cyperus chinsalensis Podlech
- Cyperus chionocephalus (Chiov.) Chiov.
- Cyperus chlorocephalus (C.B.Clarke) Kük.
- Cyperus chlorotropis (Steud.) Mattf. & Kük.
- Cyperus chordorrhizus Chiov.
- Cyperus chorisanthus C.B.Clarke
- Cyperus chrysanthoides (Mtot.) Huygh
- Cyperus chrysanthus Boeckeler
- Cyperus chrysocephalus (K.Schum.) Kük.
- Cyperus ciliatopilosus Mattf. & Kük.
- Cyperus ciliatus Jungh.
- Cyperus cinereobrunneus Kük.
- Cyperus clandestinus Steud.
- Cyperus clarkei T.Cooke
- Cyperus clarus S.T.Blake
- Cyperus clavinux C.B.Clarke
- Cyperus colchicus K.Koch
- Cyperus columbiensis Palla
- Cyperus colymbetes Kotschy & Peyr.
- Cyperus commixtus Kük.
- Cyperus comosipes Mattf. & Kük.
- Cyperus compactus Retz.
- Cyperus compressiformis (Cherm.) Kük.
- Cyperus compressus L.
- Cyperus concinnus R.Br.
- Cyperus confertus Sw.
- Cyperus congensis C.B.Clarke
- Cyperus congestus Vahl
- Cyperus conglobatus Humb. ex Link
- Cyperus conglomeratus Rottb.
- Cyperus conicus (R.Br.) Boeckeler
- Cyperus conservator-davidii G.C.Tucker
- Cyperus consors C.B.Clarke
- Cyperus constanzae Urb.
- Cyperus constrictus (Goetgh.) Bauters
- Cyperus controversus (Steud.) Mattf. & Kük.
- Cyperus coonoorensis Viji, Pandur., Deepu & G.C.Tucker
- Cyperus coriifolius Boeckeler
- Cyperus cornelii-ostenii Kük.
- Cyperus correllii (T.Koyama) G.C.Tucker
- Cyperus corymbosus Rottb.
- Cyperus costaricensis Gómez-Laur.
- Cyperus costatus Mattf. & Kük.
- Cyperus cracens K.L.Wilson
- Cyperus crassicuspis (J.Raynal) Bauters
- Cyperus crassipes Vahl
- Cyperus cremeomariscus Lye
- Cyperus crispulus K.L.Wilson
- Cyperus cristulatus S.T.Blake
- Cyperus croceus Vahl
- Cyperus cruentus Rottb.
- Cyperus crypsoides J.Kern
- Cyperus cundudoensis Chiov.
- Cyperus cunninghamii (C.B.Clarke) C.A.Gardner
- Cyperus curvistylis J.Kern
- Cyperus cuspidatus Kunth
- Cyperus cymulosus P.Willemet
- Cyperus cyperinus (Retz.) Valck.Sur.
- Cyperus cyperoides (L.) Kuntze
- Cyperus cyprius Post

== D ==
- Cyperus dactyliformis Boeckeler
- Cyperus dactylotes Benth.
- Cyperus davidsei G.C.Tucker
- Cyperus × deamii O'Neill
- Cyperus debilissimus Baker
- Cyperus deciduus Boeckeler
- Cyperus decompositus (R.Br.) F.Muell.
- Cyperus decurvatus (C.B.Clarke) C.Archer & Goetgh.
- Cyperus delavayi (C.B.Clarke) Kük.
- Cyperus demangei (J.Raynal) Lye
- Cyperus densibulbosus Lye
- Cyperus dentatus Torr.
- Cyperus dentoniae G.C.Tucker
- Cyperus denudatus L.f.
- Cyperus derreilema Steud.
- Cyperus diamantinus (D.A.Simpson) Govaerts
- Cyperus diandrus Torr.
- Cyperus diaphanus Schrad.
- Cyperus dichromeniformis Kunth
- Cyperus dichromus C.B.Clarke
- Cyperus dichrostachyus Hochst. ex A.Rich.
- Cyperus dietrichiae Boeckeler
- Cyperus difformis L.
- Cyperus diffusus Vahl
- Cyperus digitatus Roxb.
- Cyperus dilatatus Schumach.
- Cyperus dioicus I.M.Johnst.
- Cyperus dipsaceus Liebm.
- Cyperus dipsacoides (Schumach.) Bauters
- Cyperus disjunctus C.B.Clarke
- Cyperus distans L.f.
- Cyperus distichus (Merxm. & Czech) Bauters
- Cyperus distinctus Steud.
- Cyperus diurensis Boeckeler
- Cyperus dives Delile
- Cyperus divulsus Ridl.
- Cyperus diwakarii Wad.Khan & Solanke
- Cyperus drakensbergensis (Vorster) Govaerts
- Cyperus dregeanus Kunth
- Cyperus drummondii Torr. & Hook.
- Cyperus dubius Rottb.
- Cyperus duclouxii E.G.Camus
- Cyperus dunensis (Cherm.) Kük.
- Cyperus duripes I.M.Johnst.
- Cyperus durus Kunth
- Cyperus dwarkensis K.C.Sahni & H.B.Naithani

== E ==
- Cyperus eboracensis R.Booth, D.J.Moore & Hodgon
- Cyperus echinatus (L.) Alph.Wood
- Cyperus echinus (J.Raynal) Bauters
- Cyperus eglobosus K.L.Wilson
- Cyperus ekmanii Kük.
- Cyperus elatus L.
- Cyperus elegans L.
- Cyperus elegantulus Steud.
- Cyperus elephantinus (C.B.Clarke) C.B.Clarke
- Cyperus endlichii Kük.
- Cyperus enervis R.Br.
- Cyperus engelmannii Steud.
- Cyperus entrerianus Boeckeler
- Cyperus ephemerus Kukkonen & Väre
- Cyperus eragrostis Lam.
- Cyperus erectus (Schumach.) Mattf. & Kük.
- Cyperus eremicus Kukkonen
- Cyperus erinaceus (Ridl.) Kük.
- Cyperus eriocauloides (Steud.) Bauters
- Cyperus erythrocephalus (S.S.Hooper) Bauters
- Cyperus erythrorhizos Muhl.
- Cyperus esculentus L.
- Cyperus exaltatus Retz.
- Cyperus excurrens J.R.Carter & P.D.Lowe
- Cyperus eximius (C.B.Clarke) Mattf. & Kük.
- Cyperus expansus Poir.

== F ==
- Cyperus falcatus Ehrenb. ex Boeckeler
- Cyperus fastigiatus Rottb.
- Cyperus fauriei Kük.
- Cyperus feani F.Br.
- Cyperus fedoniae G.C.Tucker
- Cyperus felicis (J.Raynal) Lye
- Cyperus felipponei Kük.
- Cyperus fendlerianus Boeckeler
- Cyperus ferax Rich.
- Cyperus ferrugineoviridis (C.B.Clarke) Kük.
- Cyperus fertilis Boeckeler
- Cyperus filicinus Vahl
- Cyperus filiculmis Vahl
- Cyperus filifolius Willd. ex Kunth
- Cyperus filiformis Sw.
- Cyperus filipes Benth.
- Cyperus fischerianus G.W.Schimp. ex A.Rich.
- Cyperus fissus Steud.
- Cyperus flaccidus R.Br.
- Cyperus flavescens L.
- Cyperus flavidus Retz.
- Cyperus flavoculmis Lye
- Cyperus floribundus (Kük.) R.Carter & S.D.Jones
- Cyperus floridanus Britton
- Cyperus foliaceus C.B.Clarke
- Cyperus fontinalis (Cherm.) Kük.
- Cyperus forskalianus Väre & Kukkonen
- Cyperus fraternus Kunth
- Cyperus fucosus K.L.Wilson
- Cyperus fugax Liebm.
- Cyperus fuligineus Chapm.
- Cyperus fulvoalbescens T.Koyama
- Cyperus fulvus R.Br.
- Cyperus fuscescens Willd. ex Link
- Cyperus fuscovaginatus Kük.
- Cyperus fuscus L.

== G ==
- Cyperus gardneri Nees
- Cyperus gayi (C.B.Clarke) Kük.
- Cyperus giganteus Vahl
- Cyperus gigantobulbes Lye
- Cyperus gilesii Benth.
- Cyperus glaber L.
- Cyperus glaucophyllus Boeckeler
- Cyperus glomeratus L.
- Cyperus gonzaleziae G.C.Tucker
- Cyperus gossweileri Kük.
- Cyperus graciliculmis Lye
- Cyperus gracilis R.Br.
- Cyperus gracillimus (Chiov.) Kük.
- Cyperus grammicus Kunze ex Kunth
- Cyperus granatensis C.B.Clarke
- Cyperus grandibulbosus C.B.Clarke
- Cyperus grandifolius Andersson
- Cyperus grandis C.B.Clarke
- Cyperus grandisimplex C.B.Clarke
- Cyperus granitophilus McVaugh
- Cyperus grayi Torr.
- Cyperus grayioides Mohlenbr.
- Cyperus grossianus Pedersen
- Cyperus guatemalensis Steud.
- Cyperus gubanii Väre & Kukkonen
- Cyperus guianensis (C.B.Clarke) Kük.
- Cyperus gunnii Hook.f.
- Cyperus gymnocaulos Steud.
- Cyperus gypsophilus Lye

== H ==
- Cyperus haematocephalus Boeckeler ex C.B.Clarke
- Cyperus hainanensis (Chun & F.C.How) G.C.Tucker
- Cyperus hakonensis Franch. & Sav.
- Cyperus hamulosus M.Bieb.
- Cyperus harrisii Kük.
- Cyperus haspan L.
- Cyperus hayesii (C.B.Clarke) Standl.
- Cyperus helferi Boeckeler
- Cyperus hemidrummondii Goetgh.
- Cyperus hemioccidentalis Goetgh.
- Cyperus hemisphaericus Boeckeler
- Cyperus hensii C.B.Clarke
- Cyperus hermaphroditus (Jacq.) Standl.
- Cyperus hesperius K.L.Wilson
- Cyperus heterocladus Baker
- Cyperus hieronymi Boeckeler
- Cyperus hilairenus Steud.
- Cyperus hilgendorfianus Boeckeler
- Cyperus hillebrandii Boeckeler
- Cyperus hirtellus (Chiov.) Kük.
- Cyperus holoschoenus R.Br.
- Cyperus holostigma C.B.Clarke ex Schweinf.
- Cyperus holstii Kük.
- Cyperus hooperae G.C.Tucker
- Cyperus hortensis (Salzm. ex Steud.) Dorr
- Cyperus houghtonii Torr.
- Cyperus humilis Kunth
- Cyperus hyalinus Vahl
- Cyperus hypochlorus Hillebr.
- Cyperus hypopitys G.C.Tucker
- Cyperus hystricinus Fernald
- Cyperus hystricoides (B.Nord.) Bauters

== I ==
- Cyperus imbecillis R.Br.
- Cyperus imbricatus Retz.
- Cyperus impolitus Kunth
- Cyperus impubes Steud.
- Cyperus inaequalis P.Willemet
- Cyperus inauratus (Nees ex Boeckeler) Mattf. & Kük.
- Cyperus incompressus C.B.Clarke
- Cyperus incomtus Kunth
- Cyperus indecorus Kunth
- Cyperus infucatus Kunth
- Cyperus inops C.B.Clarke
- Cyperus inselbergensis Lye
- Cyperus × insidiosus Cherm.
- Cyperus insularis Heenan & de Lange
- Cyperus intactus Vahl
- Cyperus intricatus Schrad.
- Cyperus iria L.
- Cyperus isabellinus K.L.Wilson
- Cyperus ischnos Schltdl.
- Cyperus isolepis (Nees) Bauters
- Cyperus ivohibensis (Cherm.) Kük.
- Cyperus ixiocarpus F.Muell.

== J–K ==
- Cyperus jaeggii Boeckeler
- Cyperus javanicus Houtt.
- Cyperus jeminicus Rottb.
- Cyperus juncelliformis Peter & Kük.
- Cyperus kabarensis Cherm.
- Cyperus kaessneri C.B.Clarke
- Cyperus kamtschaticus (Meinsh.) Yonek.
- Cyperus kanarensis (V.P.Prasad & N.P.Singh) V.P.Prasad & Govaerts
- Cyperus kappleri Hochst. ex Steud.
- Cyperus karisimbiensis (Cherm.) Kük.
- Cyperus karlschumannii C.B.Clarke
- Cyperus karthikeyanii Wad.Khan & Lakshmin.
- Cyperus kernii (Raymond) Bauters
- Cyperus kerstenii Boeckeler
- Cyperus kibweanus J.Duvign.
- Cyperus kilianii (Muasya & D.A.Simpson) Lye
- Cyperus kilimandscharicus Kük.
- Cyperus kipasensis Cherm.
- Cyperus kituiensis Muasya
- Cyperus koyaliensis Cherm.
- Cyperus kurzii C.B.Clarke
- Cyperus kwaleensis Lye
- Cyperus kyllingiella Larridon
- Cyperus kyllingiformis Lye

== L ==
- Cyperus lacunosus Griseb.
- Cyperus lacustris Schrad. ex Nees
- Cyperus laeteflorens (C.B.Clarke) Kük.
- Cyperus laetus J.Presl & C.Presl
- Cyperus laevigatus L.
- Cyperus laevis R.Br.
- Cyperus lancastriensis Porter
- Cyperus lanceolatus Poir.
- Cyperus lateriticus J.Raynal
- Cyperus latifolius Poir.
- Cyperus latzii K.L.Wilson
- Cyperus laxespicatus Kük.
- Cyperus laxiflorus Poir.
- Cyperus laxus Lam.
- Cyperus lecontei Torr. ex Steud.
- Cyperus lehmannii (Nees) F.Muell.
- Cyperus leiocaulon Benth.
- Cyperus lentiginosus Millsp. & Chase
- Cyperus leptocarpus (F.Muell.) Bauters
- Cyperus leptocladus Kunth
- Cyperus leptorhachis Mattf. & Kük.
- Cyperus leucaspis (J.Raynal) Bauters
- Cyperus leucocephalus Retz.
- Cyperus lhotskyanus Beck
- Cyperus ligularis L.
- Cyperus limiticola Larridon & Reynders
- Cyperus limosus Maxim.
- Cyperus linearispiculatus T.L.Dai
- Cyperus lipoater Goetgh.
- Cyperus lipocarphioides (Kük.) Lye
- Cyperus lipocomosus Goetgh.
- Cyperus lipofiliformis Goetgh.
- Cyperus lipomexicanus Goetgh.
- Cyperus lipomonostachyus Goetgh.
- Cyperus lipopygmaeus Goetgh.
- Cyperus liporobinsonii Goetgh.
- Cyperus lipothermalis Goetgh.
- Cyperus longi-involucratus Lye
- Cyperus longiculmis Pereira-Silva, Hefler & R.Trevis.
- Cyperus longifolius Poir.
- Cyperus longispicula Muasya & D.A.Simpson
- Cyperus longistylus Kük.
- Cyperus longivaginans Kük.
- Cyperus longus L.
- Cyperus lucidus R.Br.
- Cyperus luerssenii Boeckeler
- Cyperus lundellii O'Neill
- Cyperus lupulinus (Biehler) Marcks
- Cyperus luteostramineus Mattf. & Kük.
- Cyperus luteus Boeckeler
- Cyperus luzulae (L.) Retz.

== M ==
- Cyperus macer C.B.Clarke
- Cyperus macrocarpus (Kunth) Boeckeler
- Cyperus macropachycephalus Goetgh.
- Cyperus macrophyllus (Brongn.) Boeckeler
- Cyperus macrorrhizus Nees
- Cyperus macrostachyos Lam.
- Cyperus maculatus Boeckeler
- Cyperus maderaspatanus Willd.
- Cyperus mahadevanii (Govind.) V.P.Prasad & Govaerts
- Cyperus majestuosus (P.A.Duvign. & G.Léonard) Bauters
- Cyperus malabaricus (C.B.Clarke) T.Cooke
- Cyperus malaccensis Lam.
- Cyperus malawicus (J.Raynal) Lye
- Cyperus mangorensis Cherm.
- Cyperus manimae Kunth
- Cyperus mapanioides C.B.Clarke
- Cyperus maranguensis K.Schum.
- Cyperus margaritaceus Vahl
- Cyperus marginatus Thunb.
- Cyperus marlothii Boeckeler
- Cyperus marojejyensis Bosser
- Cyperus marquisensis F.Br.
- Cyperus matagoroensis Muasya & D.A.Simpson
- Cyperus matudae G.C.Tucker
- Cyperus mauretaniensis Väre & Kukkonen
- Cyperus mbitheanus (Muasya) Huygh
- Cyperus medusaeus Chiov.
- Cyperus meeboldii Kük.
- Cyperus megalanthus (Kük.) G.C.Tucker
- Cyperus meistostylus S.T.Blake
- Cyperus melanacme (Nelmes) Raymond
- Cyperus melanospermus (Nees) Valck.Sur.
- Cyperus melanostachyus Kunth
- Cyperus melas Ridl.
- Cyperus membranaceus Vahl
- Cyperus meridionalis Barros
- Cyperus × mesochorus Geise
- Cyperus metallorum (P.A.Duvign. & G.Léonard) Bauters
- Cyperus metzii (Hochst. ex Steud.) Mattf. & Kük.
- Cyperus meyenianus Kunth
- Cyperus meyerianus Kunth
- Cyperus michelianus (L.) Delile
- Cyperus michoacanensis Britton ex C.B.Clarke
- Cyperus micrantherus Cherm.
- Cyperus microaureus Lye
- Cyperus microbolbos C.B.Clarke
- Cyperus microbracteatus (Lye) Lye
- Cyperus microbrunneus G.C.Tucker
- Cyperus microbulbosus (Lye) Lye
- Cyperus microcephalus R.Br.
- Cyperus microcristatus Lye
- Cyperus microglumis D.A.Simpson
- Cyperus microiria Steud.
- Cyperus micromariscus Lye
- Cyperus micromedusaeus Lye
- Cyperus micromelas (Lye) Lye
- Cyperus micropelophilus Lye
- Cyperus microstylus (C.B.Clarke) Mattf. & Kük.
- Cyperus microumbellatus Lye
- Cyperus miliifolius Poepp. & Kunth
- Cyperus mindorensis (Steud.) Huygh
- Cyperus mirus C.B.Clarke
- Cyperus mitis Steud.
- Cyperus mogadoxensis Chiov.
- Cyperus molliglumis Cherm.
- Cyperus mollipes (C.B.Clarke) K.Schum.
- Cyperus monoflorus Lye
- Cyperus monospermus (S.M.Huang) G.C.Tucker
- Cyperus mortonii (S.S.Hooper) Lye
- Cyperus moutona F.Br.
- Cyperus mudugensis D.A.Simpson
- Cyperus multinervatus Bosser
- Cyperus multispicatus Boeckeler
- Cyperus multispiceus R.Booth, D.J.Moore & Hodgon
- Cyperus mundii (Nees) Kunth
- Cyperus mundulus Kunth
- Cyperus muniziae G.C.Tucker
- Cyperus munnarensis V.P.Prasad & Govaerts
- Cyperus mutisii (Kunth) Andersson
- Cyperus mwinilungensis Podlech
- Cyperus myrmecias Ridl.

== N ==
- Cyperus nanellus Tang & F.T.Wang
- Cyperus nanus Willd.
- Cyperus natalensis Hochst. ex C.Krauss
- Cyperus nayaritensis G.C.Tucker
- Cyperus nduru Cherm.
- Cyperus nemoralis Cherm.
- Cyperus neobarteri T.Koyama
- Cyperus neochinensis (Tang & F.T.Wang) Bauters
- Cyperus neoguinensis Kük.
- Cyperus neokunthianus Kük.
- Cyperus neotropicalis Alain
- Cyperus neourbanii Kük.
- Cyperus nervulosus (Kük.) S.T.Blake
- Cyperus ngothe (Mtot.) Huygh
- Cyperus niederleinianus Boeckeler
- Cyperus nigricans Steud.
- Cyperus nigriceps Huygh
- Cyperus nigripes (C.B.Clarke) Kük.
- Cyperus nigrofuscus T.L.Dai
- Cyperus niigatensis Ohwi
- Cyperus nipponicus Franch. & Sav.
- Cyperus nitidus Lam.
- Cyperus niveoides C.B.Clarke
- Cyperus niveus Retz.
- Cyperus noeanus Boiss.
- Cyperus nudiceps (C.B.Clarke ex Standl.) O'Neill
- Cyperus nuerensis Boeckeler
- Cyperus nutans Vahl
- Cyperus nyasensis (Podlech) Lye
- Cyperus nyererei Lye
- Cyperus nyikanus Govaerts

== O ==
- Cyperus oakfortensis Boeckeler ex C.B.Clarke
- Cyperus obbiadensis Chiov.
- Cyperus oblongoincrassatus Kük.
- Cyperus obtusatus (J.Presl & C.Presl) Mattf. & Kük.
- Cyperus obtusus P.Willemet
- Cyperus ochraceus Vahl
- Cyperus odoratus L.
- Cyperus ohwii Kük.
- Cyperus okavangensis (Podlech) Reynders
- Cyperus onerosus M.C.Johnst.
- Cyperus orgadophilus K.L.Wilson
- Cyperus ornatus R.Br.
- Cyperus orthostachyus Franch. & Sav.
- Cyperus ossicaulis Lye
- Cyperus ovatus Baldwin
- Cyperus owanii Boeckeler
- Cyperus oxycarpus S.T.Blake
- Cyperus oxylepis Nees ex Steud.

== P ==
- Cyperus pachycephalus J.Kern
- Cyperus pachyrhizus Nees
- Cyperus pachystylus (Kük.) Kük.
- Cyperus pacificus (Ohwi) Ohwi
- Cyperus pagotii (J.Raynal) Lye
- Cyperus palianparaiensis Govind.
- Cyperus pallidicolor (Kük.) G.C.Tucker
- Cyperus pallidiviridis T.Koyama
- Cyperus palmatus (Lye) C.Archer & Goetgh.
- Cyperus panamensis (C.B.Clarke) Britton ex Standl.
- Cyperus pandanophyllum C.B.Clarke
- Cyperus pangorei Rottb.
- Cyperus paniceus (Rottb.) Boeckeler
- Cyperus pannonicus Jacq.
- Cyperus paolii Chiov.
- Cyperus papyrus L.
- Cyperus paramoensis G.C.Tucker
- Cyperus parishii Britton
- Cyperus pauper Hochst. ex A.Rich.
- Cyperus pearcei C.B.Clarke
- Cyperus pectinatus Vahl
- Cyperus pedunculatus (R.Br.) J.Kern
- Cyperus pedunculosus F.Muell.
- Cyperus pelophilus Ridl.
- Cyperus pendulus Cherm.
- Cyperus pennatiformis Kük.
- Cyperus pennellii O'Neill & Ben.Ayers
- Cyperus penzoanus Pic.Serm.
- Cyperus perangustus S.T.Blake
- Cyperus perennis (M.E.Jones) O'Neill
- Cyperus perrieri (Cherm.) Hoenselaar
- Cyperus perspicuus (S.S.Hooper) Bauters
- Cyperus persquarrosus T.Koyama
- Cyperus pertenuis Roxb.
- Cyperus pervillei Boeckeler
- Cyperus peteri Kük.
- Cyperus phaeolepis Cherm.
- Cyperus phillipsiae (C.B.Clarke) Kük.
- Cyperus phleoides (Nees ex Kunth) H.Mann
- Cyperus picardae Boeckeler
- Cyperus pilosulus (C.B.Clarke) K.Schum. ex Kük.
- Cyperus pilosus Vahl
- Cyperus pinetorum Britton
- Cyperus planifolius Rich.
- Cyperus plantaginifolius Cherm.
- Cyperus plateilema (Steud.) Kük.
- Cyperus platycaulis Baker
- Cyperus platyphyllus Roem. & Schult.
- Cyperus platystylis R.Br.
- Cyperus plukenetii Fernald
- Cyperus pluricephalus Lye
- Cyperus plurinervosus Bodard
- Cyperus podocarpus Boeckeler
- Cyperus poecilus C.B.Clarke
- Cyperus poeppigii Kunth
- Cyperus pohlii (Nees) Steud.
- Cyperus poikilostachys (Nelmes) Reynders
- Cyperus polyanthelus Govind.
- Cyperus polystachyos Rottb.
- Cyperus portae-tartari K.L.Wilson
- Cyperus potiguar A.R.O.Ribeiro, M.Alves & R.C.Oliveira
- Cyperus praealtus Kük.
- Cyperus praemorsus Boeckeler
- Cyperus pratensis Boeckeler
- Cyperus pratorum Korotky
- Cyperus prieurianus (Steud.) T.Koyama
- Cyperus procerus Rottb.
- Cyperus prolifer Lam.
- Cyperus prolixus Kunth
- Cyperus proteus (Welw.) Bauters
- Cyperus psammophilus Cherm.
- Cyperus pseuderemicus Kukkonen & Väre
- Cyperus pseudobrunneus (C.B.Clarke ex Cherm.) Kük.
- Cyperus pseudobulbosus (Mtot.) Lye
- Cyperus pseudodiaphanus (S.S.Hooper) Lye
- Cyperus pseudodistans Uittien
- Cyperus pseudoflavus (Kük.) Lock
- Cyperus pseudohildebrandtii Kük.
- Cyperus pseudokyllingioides Kük.
- Cyperus pseudopeteri (Goetgh.) Bauters
- Cyperus pseudopetiolatus G.C.Tucker
- Cyperus pseudopilosus (C.B.Clarke) Govaerts
- Cyperus pseudosomaliensis Kük.
- Cyperus pseudothyrsiflorus (Kük.) R.Carter & S.D.Jones
- Cyperus pseudovegetus Steud.
- Cyperus pseudovestitus (C.B.Clarke) Kük.
- Cyperus pubens Kük.
- Cyperus pulchellus R.Br.
- Cyperus pulcher Thunb.
- Cyperus pulcherrimus Willd. ex Kunth
- Cyperus pulguerensis M.T.Strong
- Cyperus pulicaris Kük.
- Cyperus pumilus L.
- Cyperus puncticulatus Vahl
- Cyperus purpureoluteus (Ridl.) Bauters
- Cyperus purpureoviridis Lye
- Cyperus pustulatus Vahl
- Cyperus pycnostachyus (Kunth) Kunth
- Cyperus pyramidalis (Govind.) V.P.Prasad & Govaerts
- Cyperus pyrotechnicus Lock

== R ==
- Cyperus radians Nees & Meyen ex Kunth
- Cyperus ramosus (Benth.) Kük.
- Cyperus rapensis F.Br.
- Cyperus recurvispicatus Lye
- Cyperus redolens Maury ex Micheli
- Cyperus reduncus Hochst. ex Boeckeler
- Cyperus reflexus Vahl
- Cyperus refractus Engelm. ex Boeckeler
- Cyperus regiomontanus Britton
- Cyperus rehmii Merxm.
- Cyperus remotispicatus S.S.Hooper
- Cyperus remotus (C.B.Clarke) Kük.
- Cyperus renschii Boeckeler
- Cyperus retroflexus Buckley
- Cyperus retrofractus (L.) Torr.
- Cyperus retrorsus Chapm.
- Cyperus rheophyticus Lye
- Cyperus rhynchosporoides Kük.
- Cyperus rigens J.Presl & C.Presl
- Cyperus rigidellus (Benth.) J.M.Black
- Cyperus rigidifolius Steud.
- Cyperus rockii Kük.
- Cyperus rohlfsii Boeckeler
- Cyperus rotundus L.
- Cyperus rubicundus Vahl
- Cyperus rufostriatus C.B.Clarke ex Cherm.
- Cyperus rupestris Kunth
- Cyperus rupicola S.T.Blake

== S ==
- Cyperus sahelii Väre & Kukkonen
- Cyperus sandwicensis Kük.
- Cyperus sanguineoater Boeckeler
- Cyperus sanguinolentus Vahl
- Cyperus sartorii Kük.
- Cyperus scaber (R.Br.) Boeckeler
- Cyperus scabricaulis Lye
- Cyperus scariosus R.Br.
- Cyperus schaffneri Boeckeler
- Cyperus schimperianus Steud.
- Cyperus schinzii Boeckeler
- Cyperus schlechteri C.B.Clarke
- Cyperus schoenomorphus Steud.
- Cyperus schomburgkianus Nees
- Cyperus schweinfurthii (Chiov.) Kük.
- Cyperus schweinitzii Torr.
- Cyperus sciaphilus Cherm.
- Cyperus scleropodus Chiov.
- Cyperus sculptus S.T.Blake
- Cyperus secubans K.L.Wilson
- Cyperus seemannianus Boeckeler
- Cyperus semifertilis S.T.Blake
- Cyperus semiochraceus Boeckeler
- Cyperus semitrifidus Schrad.
- Cyperus sensilis Baijnath
- Cyperus serotinus Rottb.
- Cyperus seslerioides Kunth
- Cyperus setigerus Torr. & Hook.
- Cyperus sexangularis Nees
- Cyperus sexflorus R.Br.
- Cyperus sharonensis Danin & Kukkonen
- Cyperus sharpei R.Booth, D.J.Moore & Hodgon
- Cyperus sieberianus Spreng.
- Cyperus sikkimensis Kük.
- Cyperus silletensis Nees
- Cyperus simaoensis Y.Y.Qian
- Cyperus simplex Kunth
- Cyperus simpsonii (Muasya) Larridon
- Cyperus solidifolius Boeckeler
- Cyperus solidus Kunth
- Cyperus somalidunensis Lye
- Cyperus somaliensis C.B.Clarke
- Cyperus soongoricus Kar. & Kir.
- Cyperus sordidus J.Presl & C.Presl
- Cyperus soyauxii Boeckeler
- Cyperus spectabilis Link
- Cyperus sphacelatus Rottb.
- Cyperus sphaerocephalus Vahl
- Cyperus sphaeroideus L.A.S.Johnson & O.D.Evans
- Cyperus sphaerolepis Boeckeler
- Cyperus sphaerospermus Schrad.
- Cyperus spiciger Vahl
- Cyperus spiralis Larridon
- Cyperus splendens (Cherm.) Kük.
- Cyperus sporobolus R.Br.
- Cyperus squarrosus L.
- Cyperus steadii Kük.
- Cyperus stenophyllus J.V.Suringar
- Cyperus stergiosii G.C.Tucker
- Cyperus steudneri (Boeckeler) Larridon
- Cyperus stewartii G.C.Tucker
- Cyperus stolonifer Retz.
- Cyperus stradbrokensis Domin
- Cyperus stramineoferrugineus Kük.
- Cyperus strigosus L.
- Cyperus subaequalis Baker
- Cyperus subbadius Kük.
- Cyperus subcaracasanus Kük.
- Cyperus subcastaneus D.A.Simpson
- Cyperus subfuscus Debeaux
- Cyperus submicrolepis Kük.
- Cyperus subpapuanus Kük.
- Cyperus subtenax Kük.
- Cyperus subtenuis (Kük.) M.T.Strong
- Cyperus subtilis (Kük.) Väre & Kukkonen
- Cyperus subulatus R.Br.
- Cyperus sulcinux C.B.Clarke
- Cyperus surinamensis Rottb.
- Cyperus svensonii G.C.Tucker
- Cyperus swartzii (A.Dietr.) Boeckeler ex Kük.
- Cyperus szechuanensis T.Koyama

== T ==
- Cyperus tabina Steud. ex Boeckeler
- Cyperus tabularis Schrad.
- Cyperus tacnensis Nees & Meyen
- Cyperus tanganyicanus (Kük.) Lye
- Cyperus tanyphyllus Ridl.
- Cyperus tatandaensis Muasya & D.A.Simpson
- Cyperus tempeae G.C.Tucker
- Cyperus tenax Boeckeler
- Cyperus tenellus L.f.
- Cyperus tenerrimus J.Presl & C.Presl
- Cyperus tenuiculmis Boeckeler
- Cyperus tenuiflorus Rottb.
- Cyperus tenuis Sw.
- Cyperus tenuispica Steud.
- Cyperus tenuispiculatus Boeckeler
- Cyperus tetracarpus Boeckeler
- Cyperus tetraformis Desv.
- Cyperus tetragonus Elliott
- Cyperus tetraphyllus R.Br.
- Cyperus textilis Thunb.
- Cyperus thomsonii Boeckeler
- Cyperus thorelii E.G.Camus
- Cyperus thorncroftii McClean
- Cyperus thunbergii Vahl
- Cyperus thyrsiflorus Jungh. ex Schltdl.
- Cyperus tomaiophyllus K.Schum.
- Cyperus tonkinensis C.B.Clarke
- Cyperus trachysanthos Hook. & Arn.
- Cyperus trailii C.B.Clarke
- Cyperus trialatus (Boeckeler) J.Kern
- Cyperus trichodes Griseb.
- Cyperus trigonellus Suess.
- Cyperus trinervis R.Br.
- Cyperus trisulcus D.Don
- Cyperus × turbatus Baijnath
- Cyperus turrialbanus Gómez-Laur.
- Cyperus turrillii Kük.
- Cyperus tweediei C.B.Clarke

== U–Z ==
- Cyperus uncinulatus Schrad. ex Nees
- Cyperus undulatus Kük.
- Cyperus unicolor Boeckeler
- Cyperus unifolius Boeckeler
- Cyperus unispicatus Bauters, Reynders & Goetgh.
- Cyperus urbani Boeckeler
- Cyperus usitatus Burch. ex Roem. & Schult.
- Cyperus ustulatus A.Rich.
- Cyperus vaginatus R.Br.
- Cyperus vandervekenii Reynders, Dhooge & Goetgh.
- Cyperus varicus (C.B.Clarke ex Cherm.) Kük.
- Cyperus ventricosus R.Br.
- Cyperus vestitus Hochst. ex C.Krauss
- Cyperus victoriensis C.B.Clarke
- Cyperus virens Michx.
- Cyperus viscidulus K.L.Wilson
- Cyperus volckmannii Phil.
- Cyperus volodia Cherm.
- Cyperus vorsteri K.L.Wilson
- Cyperus wallichianus Spreng.
- Cyperus whitmeei (C.B.Clarke) Kük.
- Cyperus wilburii G.C.Tucker
- Cyperus wissmannii O.Schwartz
- Cyperus xanthostachyus Steud.
- Cyperus xerophilus Cherm.
- Cyperus yadavii Wad.Khan, D.P.Chavan & Solanke
- Cyperus zollingeri Steud.
- Cyperus zollingerioides C.B.Clarke

== Formerly accepted species ==
The following taxa were accepted in The Plant List in 2015, but are no longer considered valid.

- Cyperus cyrtolepis Torr. & Hook. – now Cyperus acuminatus
- Cyperus involucratus Rottb. - now Cyperus alternifolius
- Cyperus variabilis Salzm. ex Steud. – now Cyperus esculentus
- Cyperus zanzibarensis C.B.Clarke - now Cyperus pulchellus
