= Cyperus babakan =

Scientific classification
- Kingdom: Plantae
- Clade: Tracheophytes
- Clade: Angiosperms
- Clade: Monocots
- Clade: Commelinids
- Order: Poales
- Family: Cyperaceae
- Genus: Cyperus
- Species: C. babakan

Binomial name
- Cyperus babakan Steud.

Species of flowering plant in the sedge family

Cyperus babakan is a species of sedge that is native to Asia, extending from south eastern parts of Tibet through to Papua New Guinea.

The species was first formally described by the botanist Ernst Gottlieb von Steudel in 1854.

== See also ==
- List of Cyperus species
