= Cyperus sciaphilus =

Scientific classification
- Kingdom: Plantae
- Clade: Tracheophytes
- Clade: Angiosperms
- Clade: Monocots
- Clade: Commelinids
- Order: Poales
- Family: Cyperaceae
- Genus: Cyperus
- Species: C. sciaphilus

Binomial name
- Cyperus sciaphilus Cherm.

Species of plant endemic to Madagascar

Cyperus sciaphilus is a species of sedge that is endemic to eastern Madagascar.

The species was first formally described by the botanist Henri Chermezon in 1920.

== See also ==
- List of Cyperus species
