= Cyperus palianparaiensis =

Scientific classification
- Kingdom: Plantae
- Clade: Tracheophytes
- Clade: Angiosperms
- Clade: Monocots
- Clade: Commelinids
- Order: Poales
- Family: Cyperaceae
- Genus: Cyperus
- Species: C. palianparaiensis

Binomial name
- Cyperus palianparaiensis Govind. 1990

Species of sedge

Cyperus palianparaiensis is a species of sedge that is native to parts of India. The species was first described by Ethirajalu Govindarajalu in 1990.

== See also ==
- List of Cyperus species
