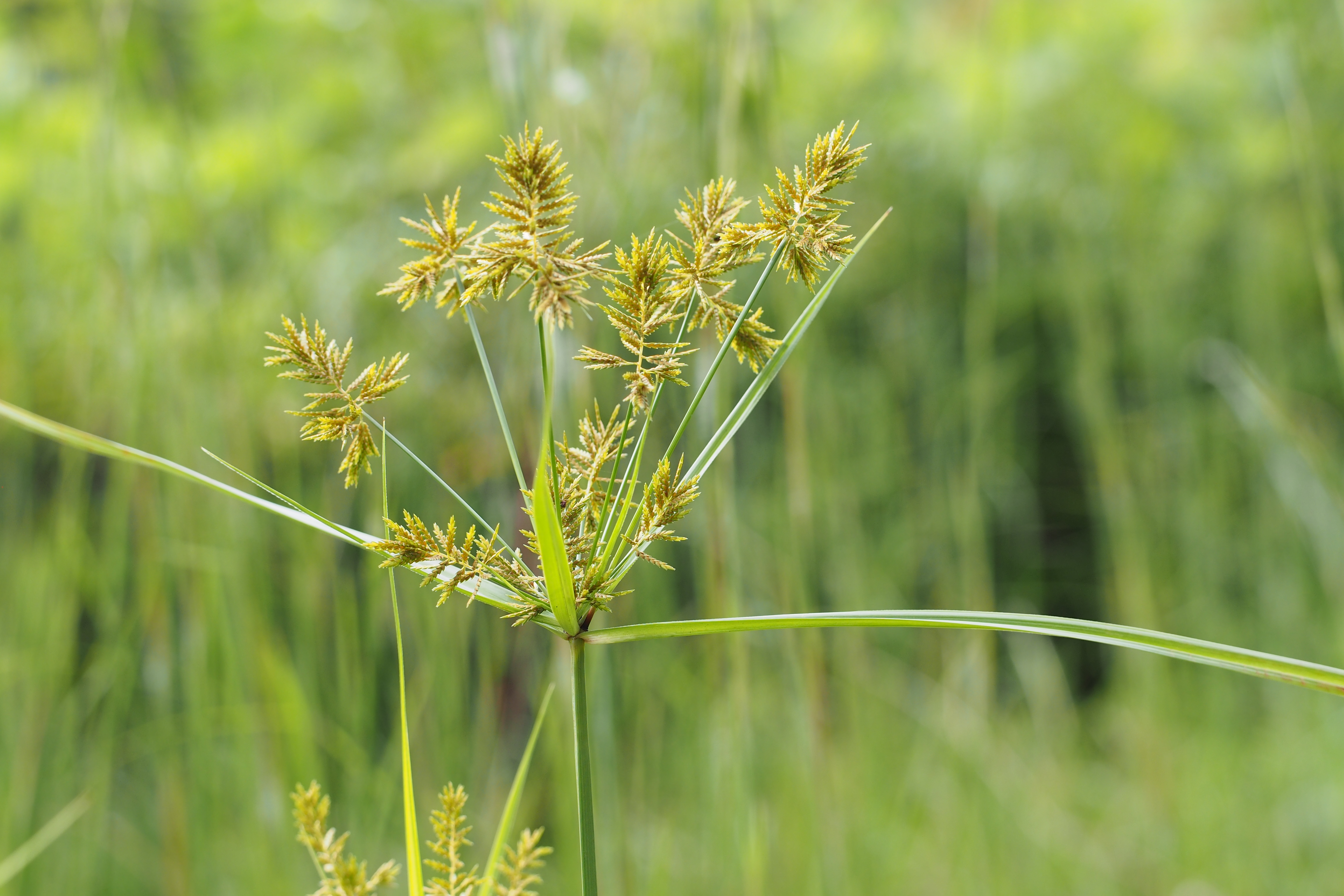

Scientific classification
- Kingdom: Plantae
- Clade: Tracheophytes
- Clade: Angiosperms
- Clade: Monocots
- Clade: Commelinids
- Order: Poales
- Family: Cyperaceae
- Genus: Cyperus
- Species: C. microiria

Binomial name
- Cyperus microiria Steud.

= Cyperus microiria =

Species of plant in the sedge family

Cyperus microiria, commonly known as the Asian flatsedge, is a species of sedge from Asia It is found from the Himalayas to Japan.

The species was first formally described by the botanist Ernst Gottlieb von Steudel in 1854.

== See also ==
- List of Cyperus species
