= Cyperus microbrunneus =

Scientific classification
- Kingdom: Plantae
- Clade: Tracheophytes
- Clade: Angiosperms
- Clade: Monocots
- Clade: Commelinids
- Order: Poales
- Family: Cyperaceae
- Genus: Cyperus
- Species: C. microbrunneus

Binomial name
- Cyperus microbrunneus G.C.Tucker, 1983

Species of sedge

Cyperus microbrunneus is a species of sedge that is native to Central America and southern parts of Mexico.

== See also ==
- List of Cyperus species
