= Cyperus trichodes =

Scientific classification
- Kingdom: Plantae
- Clade: Tracheophytes
- Clade: Angiosperms
- Clade: Monocots
- Clade: Commelinids
- Order: Poales
- Family: Cyperaceae
- Genus: Cyperus
- Species: C. trichodes

Binomial name
- Cyperus trichodes Griseb.

Species of sedge

Cyperus trichodes is a species of flowering plant in the family Cyperaceae. It is a sedge that is native to parts of Jamaica.

== See also ==
- List of Cyperus species
