= Cyperus crispulus =

Scientific classification
- Kingdom: Plantae
- Clade: Tracheophytes
- Clade: Angiosperms
- Clade: Monocots
- Clade: Commelinids
- Order: Poales
- Family: Cyperaceae
- Genus: Cyperus
- Species: C. crispulus

Binomial name
- Cyperus crispulus K.L.Wilson

Species of plant

Cyperus crispulus is a sedge of the family Cyperaceae that is native to Australia and found in Western Australia, and the Northern Territory.

The perennial sedge typically grows to a height of 0.2 to 0.4 metres (0.7 to 1.3 ft) in height and has a tufted habit and produces brown flowers.

It is found in rock crevices amongst sandstone outcrops in the Kimberley region of Western Australia.

The species was first described in 1991 by Karen Wilson. There are no synonyms.

== See also ==
- List of Cyperus species
