= Cyperus auriculatus =

Conservation status
- Critically Imperiled (NatureServe)

Scientific classification
- Kingdom: Plantae
- Clade: Tracheophytes
- Clade: Angiosperms
- Clade: Monocots
- Clade: Commelinids
- Order: Poales
- Family: Cyperaceae
- Genus: Cyperus
- Species: C. auriculatus

Binomial name
- Cyperus auriculatus Nees & Meyen ex Kunth

Species of sedge

Cyperus auriculatus, commonly known as the eared flatsedge, is a species of sedge that is native to some islands of Hawaii.

== See also ==
- List of Cyperus species
