= Cyperus subfuscus =

Scientific classification
- Kingdom: Plantae
- Clade: Tracheophytes
- Clade: Angiosperms
- Clade: Monocots
- Clade: Commelinids
- Order: Poales
- Family: Cyperaceae
- Genus: Cyperus
- Species: C. subfuscus

Binomial name
- Cyperus subfuscus Debeaux, 1877

Species of sedge

Cyperus subfuscus is a species of sedge that is native to northern and central parts of China.

== See also ==
- List of Cyperus species
