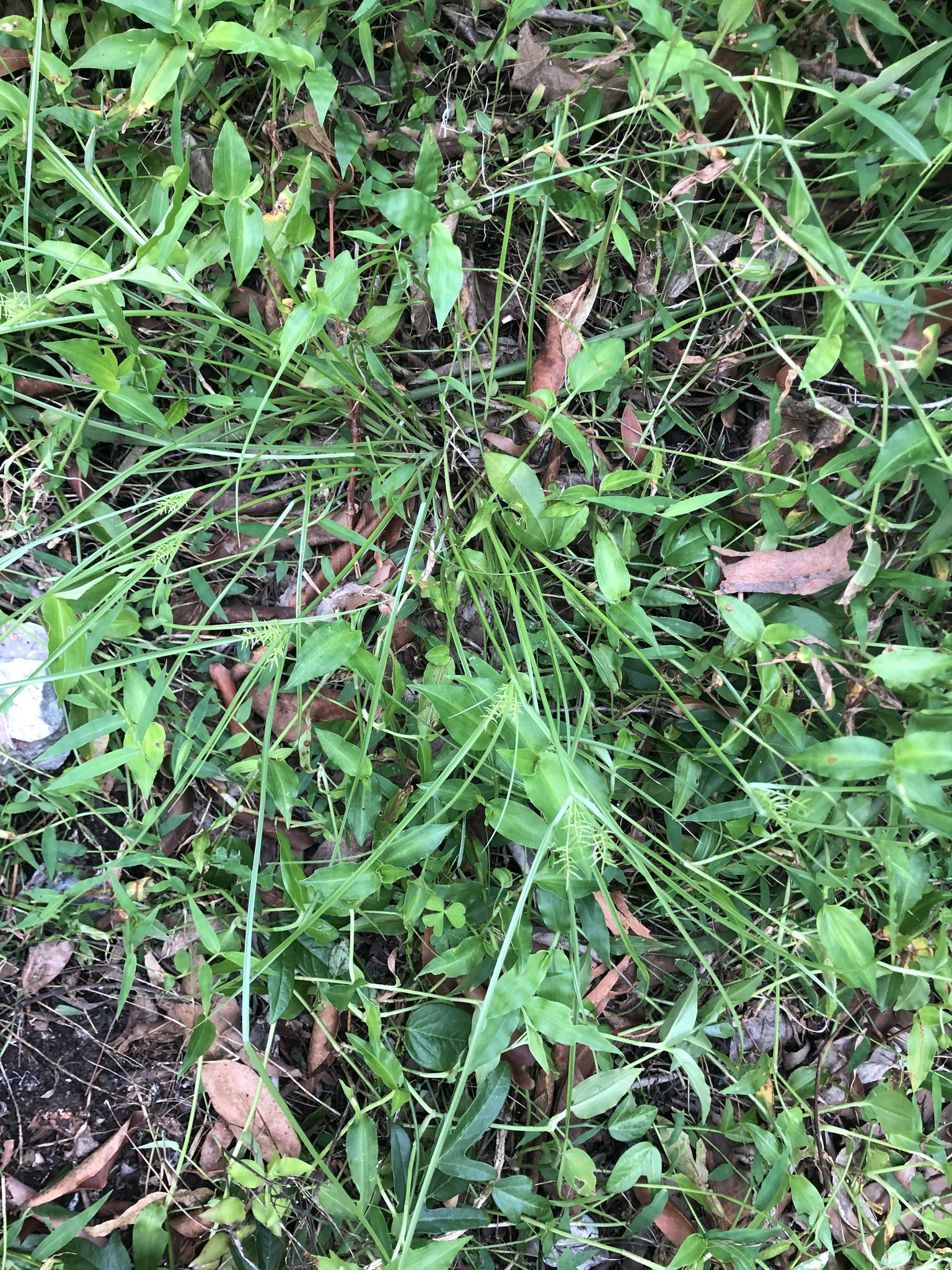
- Growing in Mt Gravatt Outlook Reserve, Queensland, Australia

Scientific classification
- Kingdom: Plantae
- Clade: Tracheophytes
- Clade: Angiosperms
- Clade: Monocots
- Clade: Commelinids
- Order: Poales
- Family: Cyperaceae
- Genus: Cyperus
- Species: C. bowmanni

Binomial name
- Cyperus bowmanni F.Muell. ex Benth.

= Cyperus bowmanni =

Species of sedge

Cyperus bowmanni is a species of sedge that is native to parts of north eastern Australia.

== See also ==
- List of Cyperus species
