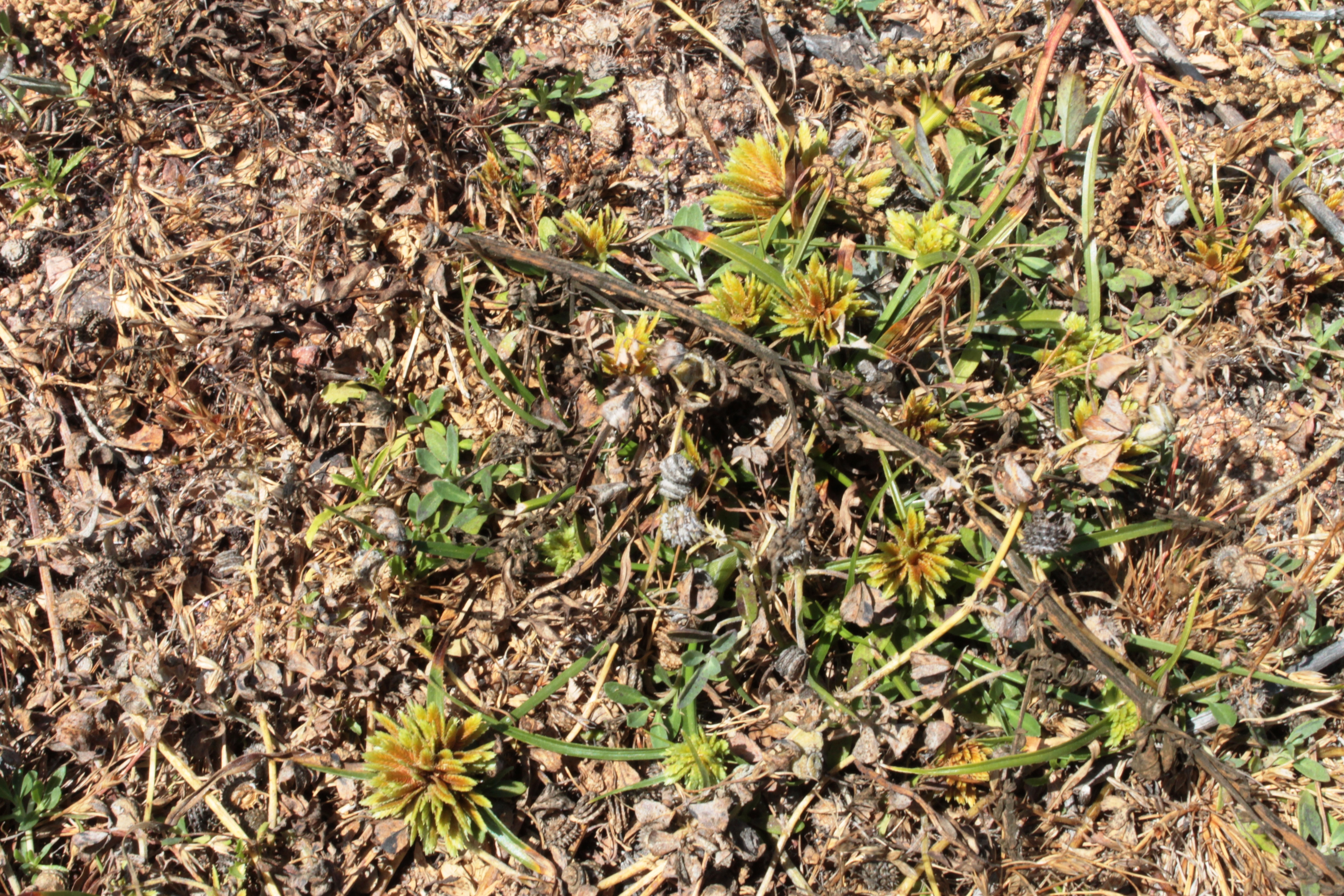

Scientific classification
- Kingdom: Plantae
- Clade: Tracheophytes
- Clade: Angiosperms
- Clade: Monocots
- Clade: Commelinids
- Order: Poales
- Family: Cyperaceae
- Genus: Cyperus
- Species: C. volckmannii

Binomial name
- Cyperus volckmannii Phil., 1865

= Cyperus volckmannii =

Species of sedge

Cyperus volckmannii is a species of sedge that is native to northern central parts of Chile.

== See also ==
- List of Cyperus species
