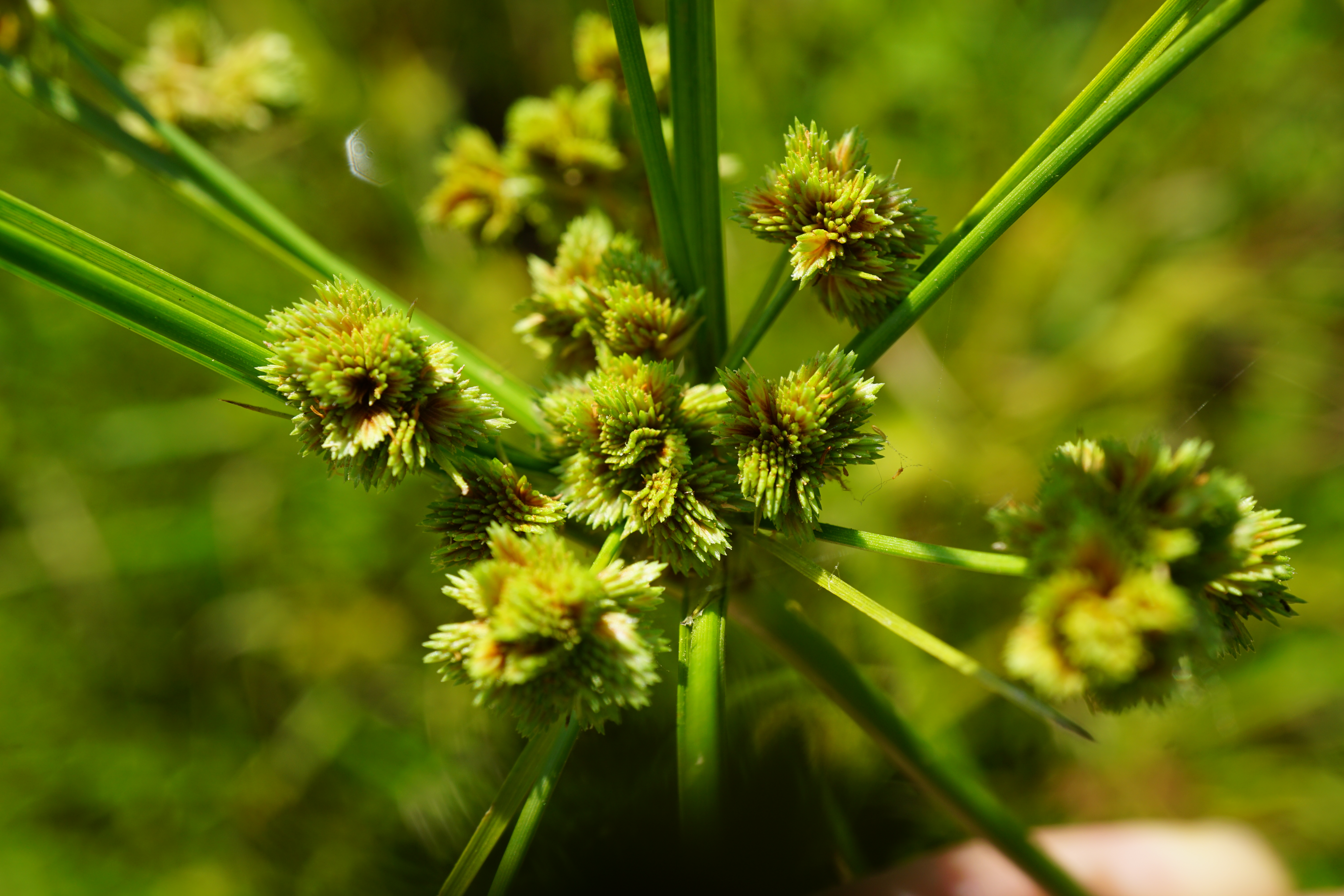

Scientific classification
- Kingdom: Plantae
- Clade: Tracheophytes
- Clade: Angiosperms
- Clade: Monocots
- Clade: Commelinids
- Order: Poales
- Family: Cyperaceae
- Genus: Cyperus
- Species: C. pseudovegetus

Binomial name
- Cyperus pseudovegetus Steud.

= Cyperus pseudovegetus =

Species of plant from North America

Cyperus pseudovegetus is a species of sedge that is found in southeastern parts of the United States, from Texas in the west, eastwards to the Atlantic Ocean. It is commonly found in habitat types with moist soils, such as pine flatwoods or the edges of rovers and ponds.

The species was first formally described by the botanist Ernst Gottlieb von Steudel in 1854.

== See also ==
- List of Cyperus species
