= Cyperus filifolius =

Scientific classification
- Kingdom: Plantae
- Clade: Tracheophytes
- Clade: Angiosperms
- Clade: Monocots
- Clade: Commelinids
- Order: Poales
- Family: Cyperaceae
- Genus: Cyperus
- Species: C. filifolius

Binomial name
- Cyperus filifolius Willd. ex Kunth, 1837

Species of sedge

Cyperus filifolius is a species of sedge that is native to northern parts of South America.

== See also ==
- List of Cyperus species
