= Cyperus incomtus =

Scientific classification
- Kingdom: Plantae
- Clade: Tracheophytes
- Clade: Angiosperms
- Clade: Monocots
- Clade: Commelinids
- Order: Poales
- Family: Cyperaceae
- Genus: Cyperus
- Species: C. incomtus

Binomial name
- Cyperus incomtus Kunth

Species of plant native to South America

Cyperus incomtus is a species of sedge that is native to parts of South America.

The species was first formally described by the botanist Carl Sigismund Kunth in 1837.

== See also ==
- List of Cyperus species
