= Cyperus harrisii =

Scientific classification
- Kingdom: Plantae
- Clade: Embryophytes
- Clade: Tracheophytes
- Clade: Spermatophytes
- Clade: Angiosperms
- Clade: Monocots
- Clade: Commelinids
- Order: Poales
- Family: Cyperaceae
- Genus: Cyperus
- Species: C. harrisii

Binomial name
- Cyperus harrisii Kük

Species of plant endemic to Jamaica

Cyperus harrisii is a species of sedge that is endemic to parts of Jamaica. The species was first formally described by the botanist Georg Kükenthal in 1926.

Cyperus harrisii belongs to the genus Cyperus within the family Cyperaceae and the order Poales.

== See also ==
- List of Cyperus species
