= Cyperus pennellii =

Scientific classification
- Kingdom: Plantae
- Clade: Tracheophytes
- Clade: Angiosperms
- Clade: Monocots
- Clade: Commelinids
- Order: Poales
- Family: Cyperaceae
- Genus: Cyperus
- Species: C. pennellii

Binomial name
- Cyperus pennellii O'Neill & Ben.Ayers 1944

Species of sedge

Cyperus pennellii is a species of sedge that is native to southern parts of Mexico and northern parts of South America.

== See also ==
- List of Cyperus species
