= Cyperus fuscescens =

Scientific classification
- Kingdom: Plantae
- Clade: Tracheophytes
- Clade: Angiosperms
- Clade: Monocots
- Clade: Commelinids
- Order: Poales
- Family: Cyperaceae
- Genus: Cyperus
- Species: C. fuscescens

Binomial name
- Cyperus fuscescens Willd. ex Link, 1820

Species of sedge

Cyperus fuscescens is a species of sedge that is endemic to the Cape Provinces of South Africa.

== See also ==
- List of Cyperus species
