= Cyperus tempeae =

Scientific classification
- Kingdom: Plantae
- Clade: Tracheophytes
- Clade: Angiosperms
- Clade: Monocots
- Clade: Commelinids
- Order: Poales
- Family: Cyperaceae
- Genus: Cyperus
- Species: C. tempeae

Binomial name
- Cyperus tempeae G.C.Tucker, 1994

Species of sedge

Cyperus tempeae is a species of sedge that is native to parts of Mexico.

== See also ==
- List of Cyperus species
