= Cyperus parishii =

Parish's flatsedge

Scientific classification
- Kingdom: Plantae
- Clade: Tracheophytes
- Clade: Angiosperms
- Clade: Monocots
- Clade: Commelinids
- Order: Poales
- Family: Cyperaceae
- Genus: Cyperus
- Species: C. parishii

Binomial name
- Cyperus parishii Britton

Synonyms
- Cyperus congestus var. parishii (Britton) Kük. in H.G.A.Engler

Species of plant

Cyperus parishii is a species of sedge known by the common name Parish's flatsedge. It is native to the southwestern United States and northwestern Mexico. It grows in desert, mountain, and coastal habitat in Sonora, southwestern New Mexico, Arizona, southern Nevada and southern California. It is an annual sedge forming small clumps up to about 25 centimeters tall. The inflorescence is a spherical cluster of up to 30 reddish spikelets with a few long, leaflike bracts at the base.

== See also ==
- List of Cyperus species
