= Cyperus absconditicoronatus =

Scientific classification
- Kingdom: Plantae
- Clade: Tracheophytes
- Clade: Angiosperms
- Clade: Monocots
- Clade: Commelinids
- Order: Poales
- Family: Cyperaceae
- Genus: Cyperus
- Species: C. absconditicoronatus

Binomial name
- Cyperus absconditicoronatus Bauers, Reynders & Goethebeur

Species of plant native to Africa

Cyperus absconditicoronatus is a species of sedge that only grows in the wild in parts of Angola and Zambia in Africa.

The specific epithet is a reference to the scales on the rhizome that resemble a crown and is derived from words meaning with a hidden crown.

== See also ==
- List of Cyperus species
