= Cyperus yadavii =

Scientific classification
- Kingdom: Plantae
- Clade: Tracheophytes
- Clade: Angiosperms
- Clade: Monocots
- Clade: Commelinids
- Order: Poales
- Family: Cyperaceae
- Genus: Cyperus
- Species: C. yadavii

Binomial name
- Cyperus yadavii Wad.Khan, D.P.Chavan & Solanke, 2006

Species of sedge

Cyperus yadavii is a species of sedge that is native to India.

== See also ==
- List of Cyperus species
