= Cyperus heterocladus =

Scientific classification
- Kingdom: Plantae
- Clade: Tracheophytes
- Clade: Angiosperms
- Clade: Monocots
- Clade: Commelinids
- Order: Poales
- Family: Cyperaceae
- Genus: Cyperus
- Species: C. heterocladus

Binomial name
- Cyperus heterocladus Baker, 1883

Species of sedge

Cyperus heterocladus is a species of sedge that is native to central parts of Madagascar.

== See also ==
- List of Cyperus species
