= Cyperus trailii =

Scientific classification
- Kingdom: Plantae
- Clade: Tracheophytes
- Clade: Angiosperms
- Clade: Monocots
- Clade: Commelinids
- Order: Poales
- Family: Cyperaceae
- Genus: Cyperus
- Species: C. trailii

Binomial name
- Cyperus trailii C.B.Clarke

Species of plant

Cyperus trailii is a species of sedge that is native to northern parts of South America.

The species was first formally described by the botanist Charles Baron Clarke in 1908.

== See also ==
- List of Cyperus species
