= Cyperus simplex =

Scientific classification
- Kingdom: Plantae
- Clade: Tracheophytes
- Clade: Angiosperms
- Clade: Monocots
- Clade: Commelinids
- Order: Poales
- Family: Cyperaceae
- Genus: Cyperus
- Species: C. simplex

Binomial name
- Cyperus simplex Kunth

Species of sedge native to the Americas

Cyperus simplex is a species of sedge that is native to southern parts of North America, Central America and northern parts of South America.

The species was first formally described by the botanist Carl Sigismund Kunth in 1816.

== See also ==
- List of Cyperus species
