= Cyperus correllii =

Conservation status
- Critically Endangered (IUCN 3.1)

Scientific classification
- Kingdom: Plantae
- Clade: Tracheophytes
- Clade: Angiosperms
- Clade: Monocots
- Clade: Commelinids
- Order: Poales
- Family: Cyperaceae
- Genus: Cyperus
- Species: C. correllii

Binomial name
- Cyperus correllii (T.Koyama) G.C.Tucker

Species of sedge

Cyperus correllii is a species of sedge that is native to parts of the Bahamas.

== See also ==
- List of Cyperus species
