= Cyperus armstrongii =

Scientific classification
- Kingdom: Plantae
- Clade: Tracheophytes
- Clade: Angiosperms
- Clade: Monocots
- Clade: Commelinids
- Order: Poales
- Family: Cyperaceae
- Genus: Cyperus
- Species: C. armstrongii

Binomial name
- Cyperus armstrongii Benth.

Species of sedge

Cyperus armstrongii is a species of sedge that is native to parts of Queensland in north eastern Australia.

It was first formally described by the botanist George Bentham in 1878.

== See also ==
- List of Cyperus species
