= Cyperus lacunosus =

Scientific classification
- Kingdom: Plantae
- Clade: Tracheophytes
- Clade: Angiosperms
- Clade: Monocots
- Clade: Commelinids
- Order: Poales
- Family: Cyperaceae
- Genus: Cyperus
- Species: C. lacunosus

Binomial name
- Cyperus lacunosus Griseb.

Species of sedge

Cyperus lacunosus is a species of flowering plant in the family Cyperaceae. It is a sedge that is native to western parts of Cuba.

== See also ==
- List of Cyperus species
