= Cyperus debilissimus =

Scientific classification
- Kingdom: Plantae
- Clade: Tracheophytes
- Clade: Angiosperms
- Clade: Monocots
- Clade: Commelinids
- Order: Poales
- Family: Cyperaceae
- Genus: Cyperus
- Species: C. debilissimus

Binomial name
- Cyperus debilissimus Baker

Species of sedge

Cyperus debilissimus is a species of sedge that is native to parts of Madagascar. It is a perennial or rhizomatous geophyte that favours and grows primarily in seasonally dry tropical environments.

== See also ==
- List of Cyperus species
