= Cyperus acholiensis =

Scientific classification
- Kingdom: Plantae
- Clade: Tracheophytes
- Clade: Angiosperms
- Clade: Monocots
- Clade: Commelinids
- Order: Poales
- Family: Cyperaceae
- Genus: Cyperus
- Species: C. acholiensis

Binomial name
- Cyperus acholiensis Larridon

Species of plant endemic to Uganda

Cyperus acholiensis is a species of sedge that is endemic to an area in northern Uganda.

== See also ==
- List of Cyperus species
