= Cyperus derreilema =

Scientific classification
- Kingdom: Plantae
- Clade: Tracheophytes
- Clade: Angiosperms
- Clade: Monocots
- Clade: Commelinids
- Order: Poales
- Family: Cyperaceae
- Genus: Cyperus
- Species: C. derreilema

Binomial name
- Cyperus derreilema Steud.

Species of plant endemic to Africa

Cyperus derreilema is a species of sedge that is endemic to Africa extending from Ethiopia in the north through to Malawi in the south.

The species was first formally described by the botanist Ernst Gottlieb von Steudel in 1842.

== See also ==
- List of Cyperus species
