= Cyperus pulcherrimus =

Scientific classification
- Kingdom: Plantae
- Clade: Tracheophytes
- Clade: Angiosperms
- Clade: Monocots
- Clade: Commelinids
- Order: Poales
- Family: Cyperaceae
- Genus: Cyperus
- Species: C. pulcherrimus

Binomial name
- Cyperus pulcherrimus Willd. ex Kunth, 1837

Species of sedge

Cyperus pulcherrimus is a species of sedge that is native to tropical parts of Asia.

== See also ==
- List of Cyperus species
