= Cyperus maranguensis =

Scientific classification
- Kingdom: Plantae
- Clade: Tracheophytes
- Clade: Angiosperms
- Clade: Monocots
- Clade: Commelinids
- Order: Poales
- Family: Cyperaceae
- Genus: Cyperus
- Species: C. maranguensis

Binomial name
- Cyperus maranguensis K.Schum., 1895

Species of sedge

Cyperus maranguensis is a species of sedge that is native to parts of eastern Africa. This species was first identified by K.Schum, the first scientific description dating to 1895. The plant is also a part of the Cyperus genus.

== Description ==
The plant grows to a height of up to 1 m (3 ft 3 in) and has slender, grass-like leaves. It produces small, greenish-brown flowers in clusters at the top of the stem. C. maranguensis is often found growing in damp or marshy areas, such as along streams and rivers, and is often used as an ornamental plant in gardens.

== Taxonomy ==
The species was first formally described by the botanist Karl Moritz Schumann in 1895 as a part of the work Die pflanzenwelt Ost-Afrikas und der nachbargebiete by Adilf Engler.

== Distribution ==
Overall, C. maranguensis is considered by many in Kenya, Tanzania, Uganda, and Mozambique. to be valuable plant species with a range of uses and ecological benefits.

== Uses ==
In traditional medicine, the leaves and roots of C. maranguensis are used to treat a variety of ailments, including fever, stomachache, and dysentery. The plant is also used to make baskets and mats, and the leaves are sometimes used for thatching roofs.

C. maranguensis is considered to be a useful plant for stabilizing soil and preventing erosion, and it is sometimes planted for this purpose in areas prone to landslides. It is also an important food source for livestock and wild animals, including antelopes, elephants, and hippopotamuses.

== See also ==
- List of Cyperus species
