= Cyperus cristulatus =

Scientific classification
- Kingdom: Plantae
- Clade: Tracheophytes
- Clade: Angiosperms
- Clade: Monocots
- Clade: Commelinids
- Order: Poales
- Family: Cyperaceae
- Genus: Cyperus
- Species: C. cristulatus

Binomial name
- Cyperus cristulatus S.T.Blake

Species of plant

Cyperus cristulatus is a sedge of the family Cyperaceae that is native to the Kimberley region of Western Australia, the Northern Territory and Queensland.

== See also ==
- List of Cyperus species
