= Cyperus hainanensis =

Scientific classification
- Kingdom: Plantae
- Clade: Tracheophytes
- Clade: Angiosperms
- Clade: Monocots
- Clade: Commelinids
- Order: Poales
- Family: Cyperaceae
- Genus: Cyperus
- Species: C. hainanensis

Binomial name
- Cyperus hainanensis (Chun & F.C.How) G.C.Tucker, 2010

Species of sedge

Cyperus hainanensis is a species of sedge that is native to Hainan.

== See also ==
- List of Cyperus species
