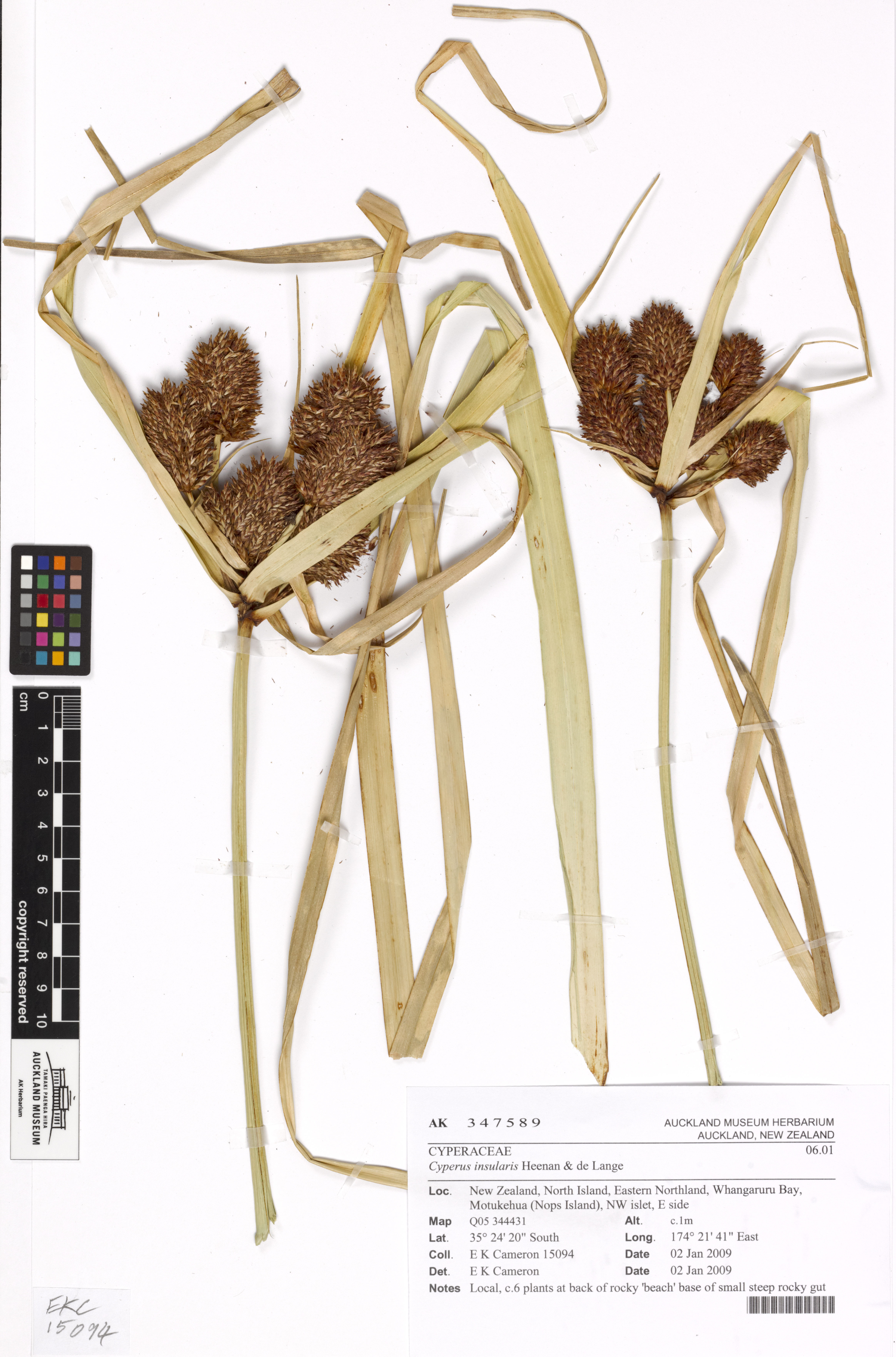

Scientific classification
- Kingdom: Plantae
- Clade: Tracheophytes
- Clade: Angiosperms
- Clade: Monocots
- Clade: Commelinids
- Order: Poales
- Family: Cyperaceae
- Genus: Cyperus
- Species: C. insularis

Binomial name
- Cyperus insularis Heenan & de Lange, 2005

= Cyperus insularis =

Species of sedge

Cyperus insularis is a species of sedge that is native to the north island of New Zealand.

== See also ==
- List of Cyperus species
