= Cyperus sikkimensis =

Scientific classification
- Kingdom: Plantae
- Clade: Tracheophytes
- Clade: Angiosperms
- Clade: Monocots
- Clade: Commelinids
- Order: Poales
- Family: Cyperaceae
- Genus: Cyperus
- Species: C. sikkimensis

Binomial name
- Cyperus sikkimensis Kük.

Species of plant from the Himalayas

Cyperus sikkimensis is a species of sedge that is endemic to Sikkim state of India in the eastern Himalaya.

The species was first formally described by the botanist Georg Kükenthal in 1936.

== See also ==
- List of Cyperus species
