= Cyperus rhynchosporoides =

Scientific classification
- Kingdom: Plantae
- Clade: Tracheophytes
- Clade: Angiosperms
- Clade: Monocots
- Clade: Commelinids
- Order: Poales
- Family: Cyperaceae
- Genus: Cyperus
- Species: C. rhynchosporoides

Binomial name
- Cyperus rhynchosporoides Kük.

Species of plant native to Africa

Cyperus rhynchosporoides is a species of sedge that is native to the African countries of Angola, the Democratic Republic of the Congo and Zambia.

The species was first formally described by the botanist Georg Kükenthal in 1936.

== See also ==
- List of Cyperus species
