= Cyperus sharpei =

Scientific classification
- Kingdom: Plantae
- Clade: Tracheophytes
- Clade: Angiosperms
- Clade: Monocots
- Clade: Commelinids
- Order: Poales
- Family: Cyperaceae
- Genus: Cyperus
- Species: C. sharpei

Binomial name
- Cyperus sharpei R.Booth, D.J.Moore & Hodgon, 2009

Species of sedge

Cyperus sharpei is a species of sedge that is native to north eastern parts of the Australia.

== See also ==
- List of Cyperus species
