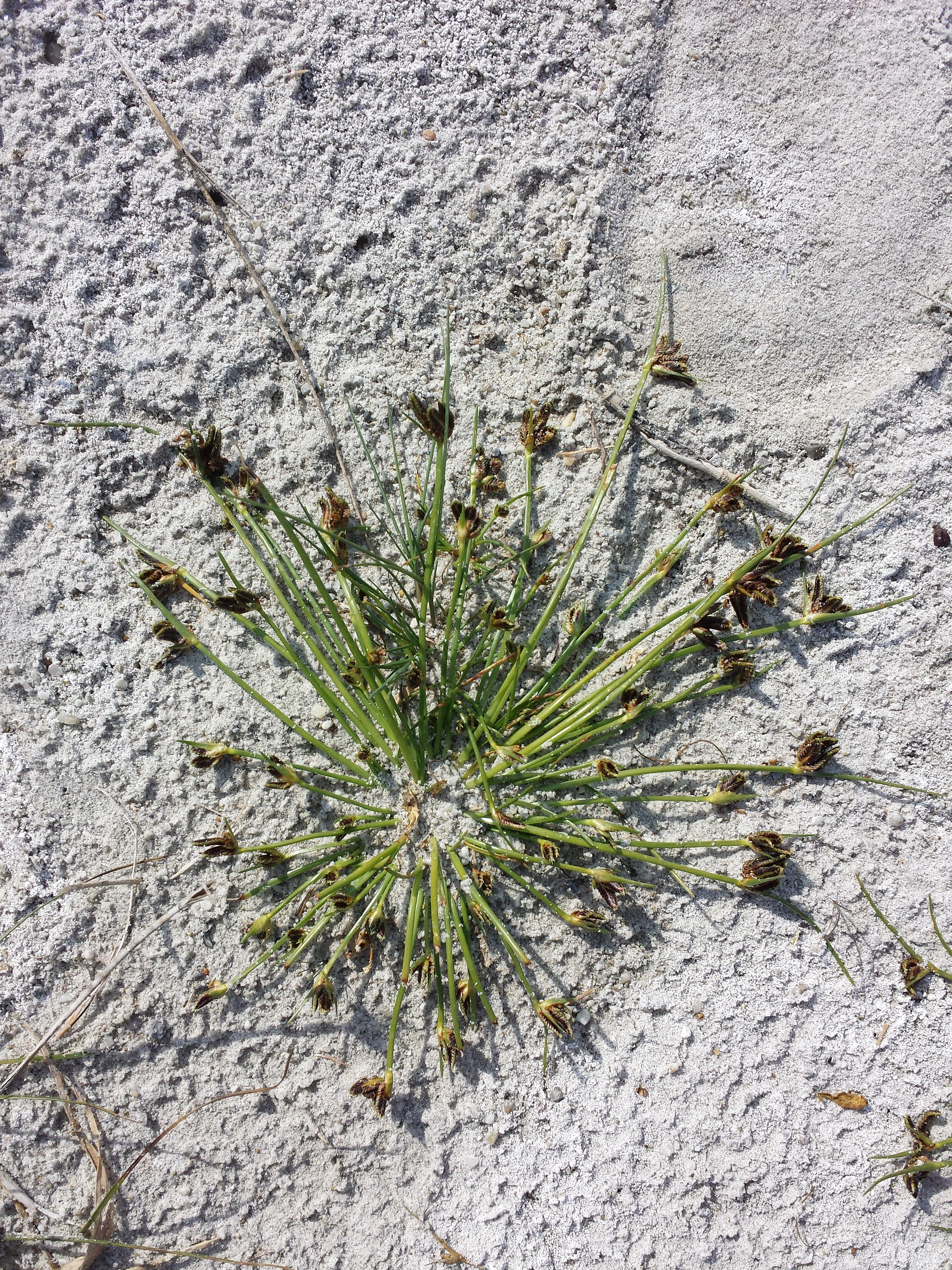
- In Austria

Scientific classification
- Kingdom: Plantae
- Clade: Tracheophytes
- Clade: Angiosperms
- Clade: Monocots
- Clade: Commelinids
- Order: Poales
- Family: Cyperaceae
- Genus: Cyperus
- Species: C. pannonicus

Binomial name
- Cyperus pannonicus Jacq. 1778

= Cyperus pannonicus =

Species of sedge

Cyperus pannonicus is a species of sedge that is native to parts of south eastern Europe and northern Asia.

== See also ==
- List of Cyperus species
