= Cyperus multispiceus =

Scientific classification
- Kingdom: Plantae
- Clade: Tracheophytes
- Clade: Angiosperms
- Clade: Monocots
- Clade: Commelinids
- Order: Poales
- Family: Cyperaceae
- Genus: Cyperus
- Species: C. multispiceus

Binomial name
- Cyperus multispiceus R.Booth, D.J.Moore & Hodgon, 2009

Species of sedge

Cyperus multispiceus is a species of sedge that is native to parts of north eastern Australia.

== See also ==
- List of Cyperus species
