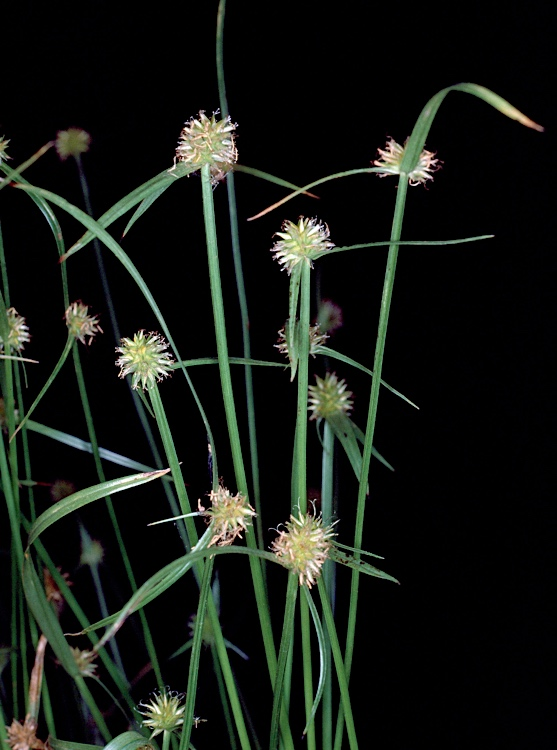
- At the Australian National Botanic Gardens

Scientific classification
- Kingdom: Plantae
- Clade: Tracheophytes
- Clade: Angiosperms
- Clade: Monocots
- Clade: Commelinids
- Order: Poales
- Family: Cyperaceae
- Genus: Cyperus
- Species: C. sphaeroideus

Binomial name
- Cyperus sphaeroideus L.A.S.Johnson & O.D.Evans, 1973

= Cyperus sphaeroideus =

Species of sedge

Cyperus sphaeroideus is a species of sedge that is native to eastern parts of Australia.

== See also ==
- List of Cyperus species
