= Cyperus kaessneri =

Scientific classification
- Kingdom: Plantae
- Clade: Tracheophytes
- Clade: Angiosperms
- Clade: Monocots
- Clade: Commelinids
- Order: Poales
- Family: Cyperaceae
- Genus: Cyperus
- Species: C. kaessneri

Binomial name
- Cyperus kaessneri C.B.Clarke

Species of plant native to Africa

Cyperus kaessneri is a species of sedge that is native to eastern Africa. The species was first formally described by the botanist Charles Baron Clarke in 1906.

== See also ==
- List of Cyperus species
