= Cyperus manimae =

Scientific classification
- Kingdom: Plantae
- Clade: Tracheophytes
- Clade: Angiosperms
- Clade: Monocots
- Clade: Commelinids
- Order: Poales
- Family: Cyperaceae
- Genus: Cyperus
- Species: C. manimae

Binomial name
- Cyperus manimae Kunth

Species of plant native to the Americas

Cyperus manimae, commonly known as the smoothstem flatsedge or the spectacular flatsedge, is a species of sedge that is native to an area of southern North America, Central America, and northern South America.

The species was first formally described by the botanist Carl Sigismund Kunth in 1816.

== See also ==
- List of Cyperus species
