= Cyperus sanguineoater =

Scientific classification
- Kingdom: Plantae
- Clade: Tracheophytes
- Clade: Angiosperms
- Clade: Monocots
- Clade: Commelinids
- Order: Poales
- Family: Cyperaceae
- Genus: Cyperus
- Species: C. sanguineoater

Binomial name
- Cyperus sanguineoater Boeckeler

Species of sedge

Cyperus sanguineoater is a species of sedge that is native to Central America, occurring in Mexico and Guatemala.

The species was first formally described by the botanist Johann Otto Boeckeler in 1881.

== See also ==
- List of Cyperus species
