= Cyperus distinctus =

Conservation status
- Apparently Secure (NatureServe)

Scientific classification
- Kingdom: Plantae
- Clade: Tracheophytes
- Clade: Angiosperms
- Clade: Monocots
- Clade: Commelinids
- Order: Poales
- Family: Cyperaceae
- Genus: Cyperus
- Species: C. distinctus

Binomial name
- Cyperus distinctus Steud.

Species of plant endemic to North America

Cyperus distinctus, also referred to as swamp flatsedge, is a species of sedge that is endemic to North America.

The species was first formally described by the botanist Ernst Gottlieb von Steudel in 1854.

== See also ==
- List of Cyperus species
