= Cyperus impubes =

Scientific classification
- Kingdom: Plantae
- Clade: Tracheophytes
- Clade: Angiosperms
- Clade: Monocots
- Clade: Commelinids
- Order: Poales
- Family: Cyperaceae
- Genus: Cyperus
- Species: C. impubes

Binomial name
- Cyperus impubes Steud.

Species of plant in the sedge family

Cyperus impubes is a species of sedge that is native to eastern Africa and islands in the western parts of the Indian Ocean.

The species was first formally described by the botanist Ernst Gottlieb von Steudel in 1854.

== See also ==
- List of Cyperus species
