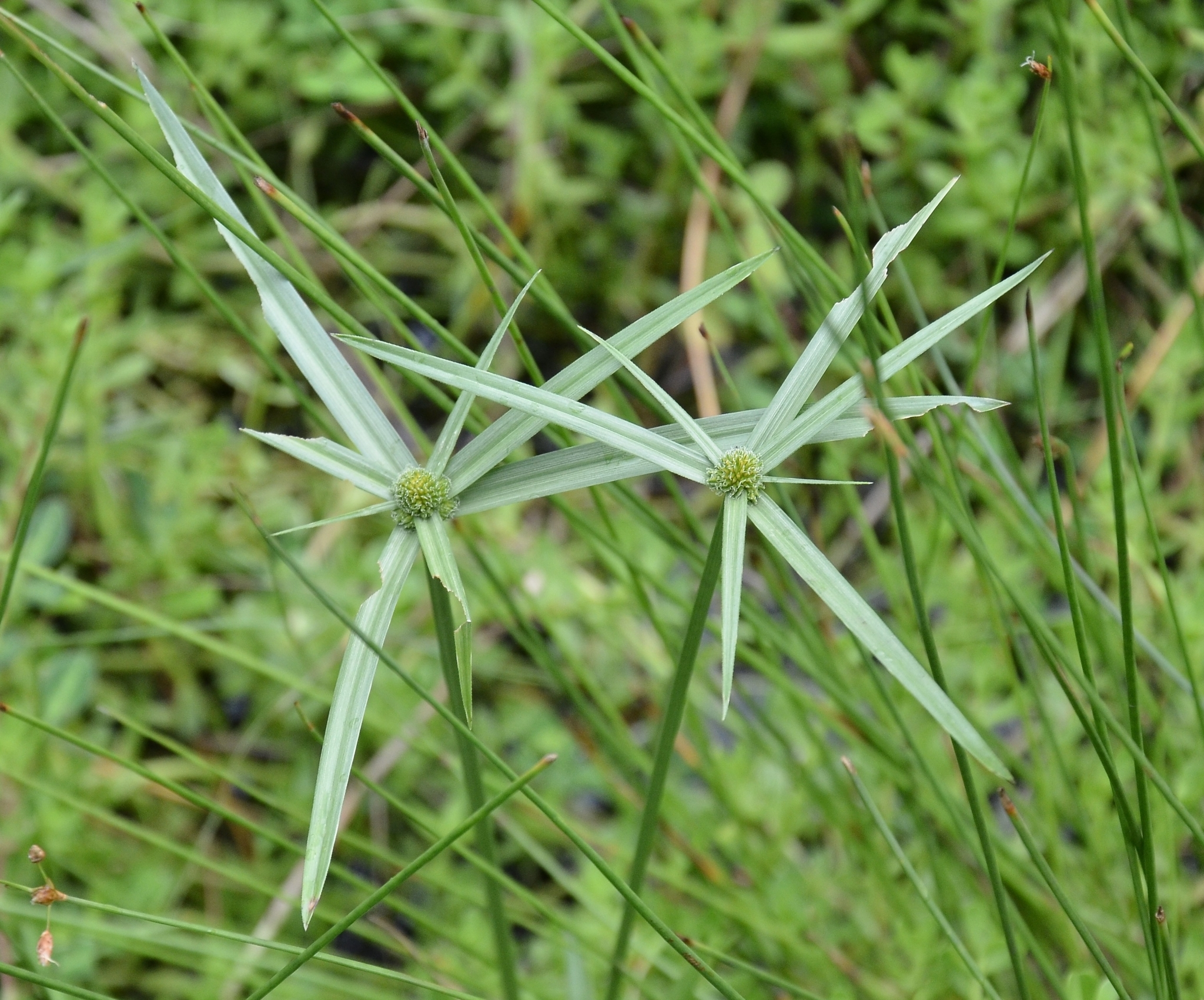

Scientific classification
- Kingdom: Plantae
- Clade: Tracheophytes
- Clade: Angiosperms
- Clade: Monocots
- Clade: Commelinids
- Order: Poales
- Family: Cyperaceae
- Genus: Cyperus
- Species: C. aromaticus

Binomial name
- Cyperus aromaticus (Ridl.) Mattf. & Kük.

Synonyms
- Cyperus aromaticus var. brachyrhizomatosus Kük.; Cyperus aromaticus var. repens Kük.; Cyperus aromaticus var. teres (C.B.Clarke) Kük.; Cyperus teres (C.B.Clarke) Lye; Kyllinga aromatica Ridl. (1884) (basionym); Kyllinga erecta var. polyphylla (Willd. ex Kunth) S.S.Hooper; Kyllinga involucrata Bojer ex Baker; Kyllinga macrantha Boeckeler; Kyllinga planiceps C.B.Clarke; Kyllinga polyphylla Willd. ex Kunth; Kyllinga teres C.B.Clarke; Kyllinga teres var. aphylla Cherm.

= Cyperus aromaticus =

Species of flowering plant

Cyperus aromaticus, the aromatic kyllinga, is a perennial plant with triangular stems and aromatic leaves, native to tropical Africa. It is also found as an introduced species in parts of Asia and Australia. The plant grows in wet, moist areas and is characterized by a flowering head that forms a tuft of spikelets. It was first formally described in 1884 by Henry Nicholas Ridley.
