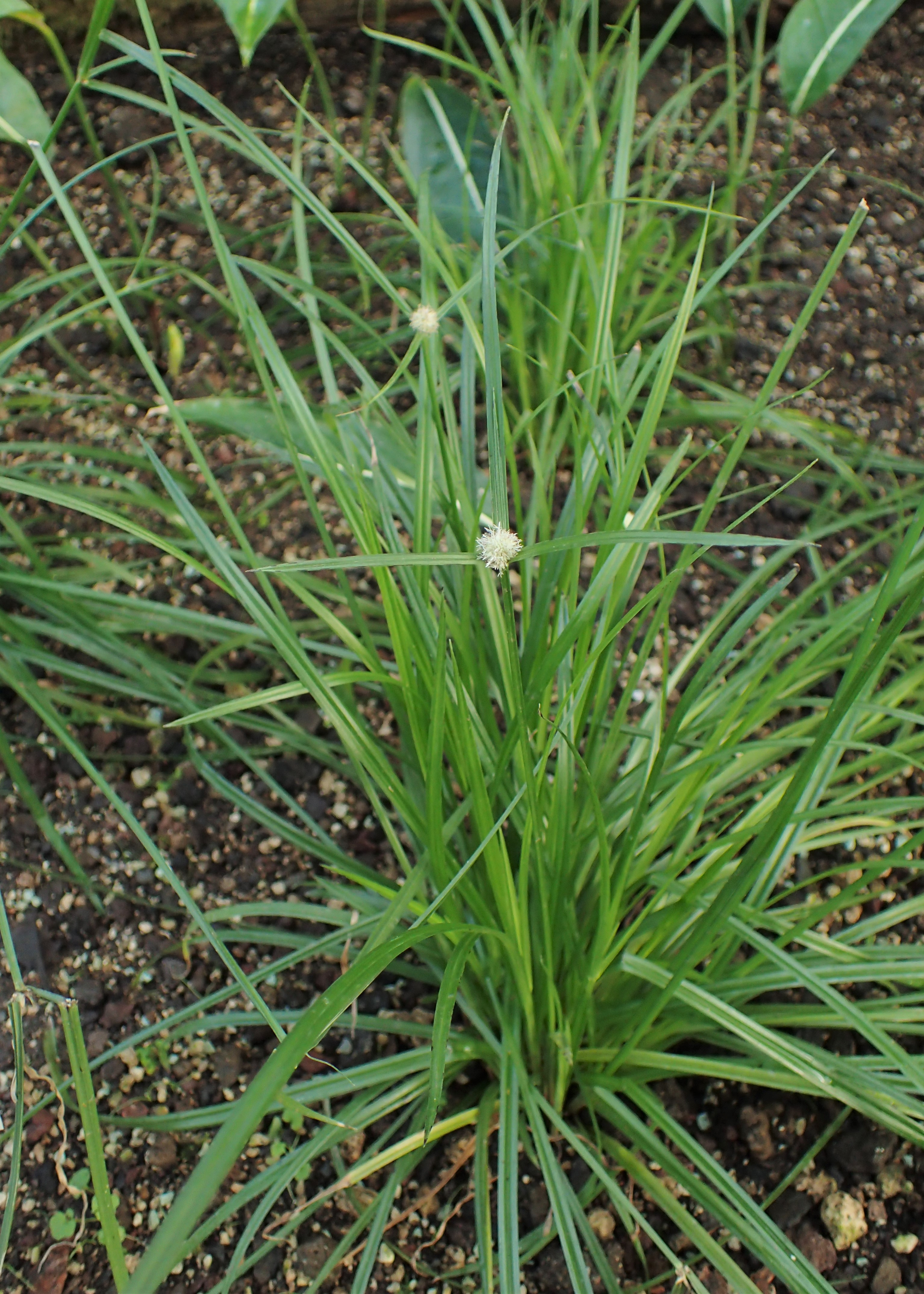

Scientific classification
- Kingdom: Plantae
- Clade: Tracheophytes
- Clade: Angiosperms
- Clade: Monocots
- Clade: Commelinids
- Order: Poales
- Family: Cyperaceae
- Genus: Cyperus
- Species: C. mindorensis

Binomial name
- Cyperus mindorensis (Steud.) Huygh

Synonyms
- Cyperus leucocephalus; Kyllinga cephalote; Kyllinga nemoralis

= Cyperus mindorensis =

Species of sedge

Cyperus mindorensis, commonly known as the white water sedge, is a species of perennial sedge in the family Cyperaceae. It is a grass-like plant in the large genus Cyperus and is distributed across the Old World Tropics, Australia, and the Pacific Islands. This species typically grows in wet habitats and is often considered a weed rather than a cultivated plant.

Cyperus mindorensis is a perennial sedge that grows up to 0.6 m tall. It has a creeping growth habit and spreads through a long rhizome (underground horizontal stem), which produces flowering stems either in tufts or singly.

The leaves are linear, measuring 1.5–3 mm in width and up to 55 cm in length. They arise from a brown to purplish-brown leaf sheath. Its overall appearance is grass-like, with slender stems and narrow leaves.

Cyperus mindorensis reproduces vegetatively through its rhizomes as well as by seed production. It is usually regarded as a weed in agricultural and natural ecosystems due to its rapid growth and spreading habit.
