= Cyperus stewartii =

Scientific classification
- Kingdom: Plantae
- Clade: Tracheophytes
- Clade: Angiosperms
- Clade: Monocots
- Clade: Commelinids
- Order: Poales
- Family: Cyperaceae
- Genus: Cyperus
- Species: C. stewartii

Binomial name
- Cyperus stewartii G.C.Tucker

Species of plant

Cyperus stewartii is a species of flowering plant in the family Cyperaceae, native to Cocos Island in the Pacific Ocean off the coast of the Central American country of Costa Rica. It was first described by Gordon C. Tucker in 2014.
