= Carex flavocuspis =

Scientific classification
- Kingdom: Plantae
- Clade: Tracheophytes
- Clade: Angiosperms
- Clade: Monocots
- Clade: Commelinids
- Order: Poales
- Family: Cyperaceae
- Genus: Carex
- Species: C. flavocuspis

Binomial name
- Carex flavocuspis Franch. & Sav.

Species of plant

Carex flavocuspis is a tussock-forming species of perennial sedge in the family Cyperaceae. It is native to northern and central parts of Japan, northern parts of China and far eastern parts of Russia.

== See also ==
- List of Carex species
