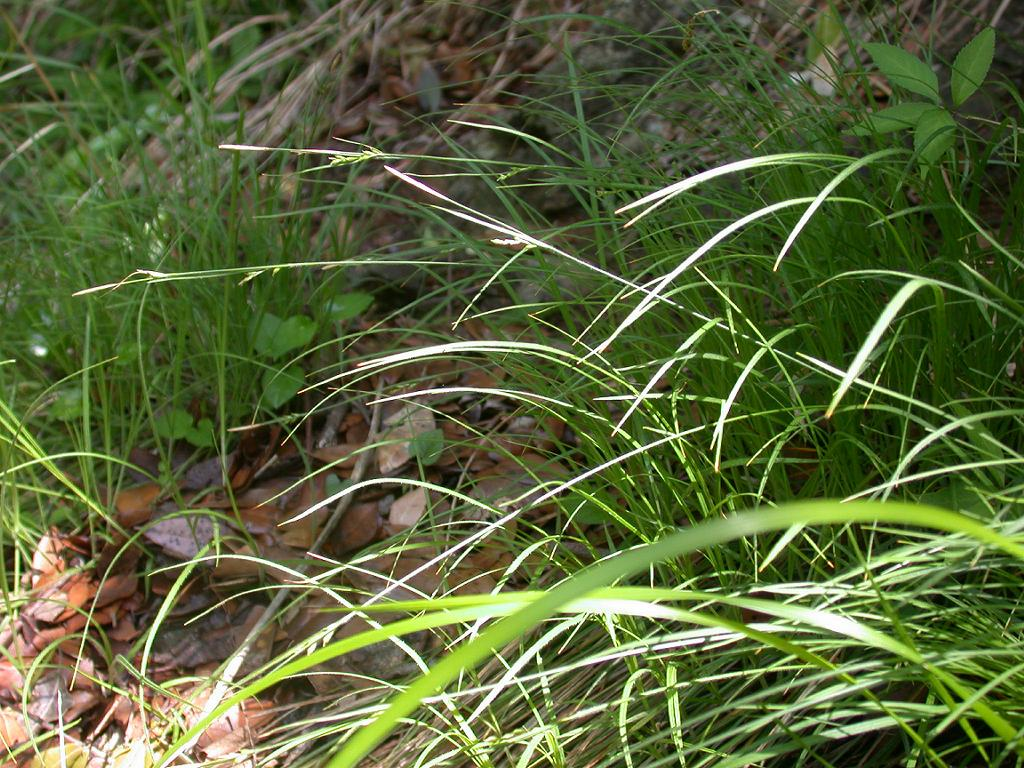

Scientific classification
- Kingdom: Plantae
- Clade: Tracheophytes
- Clade: Angiosperms
- Clade: Monocots
- Clade: Commelinids
- Order: Poales
- Family: Cyperaceae
- Genus: Carex
- Species: C. duvaliana

Binomial name
- Carex duvaliana Franch. & Sav.

= Carex duvaliana =

Species of plant

Carex duvaliana is a tussock-forming species of perennial sedge in the family Cyperaceae. It is native to southern parts of Japan and south eastern parts of China.

The species was first described in 1878 by the botanists Adrien René Franchet and Ludovic Savatier in 1878 as a part of the work Enumeratio Plantarum in Japonia Sponte Crescentium.

== See also ==
- List of Carex species
