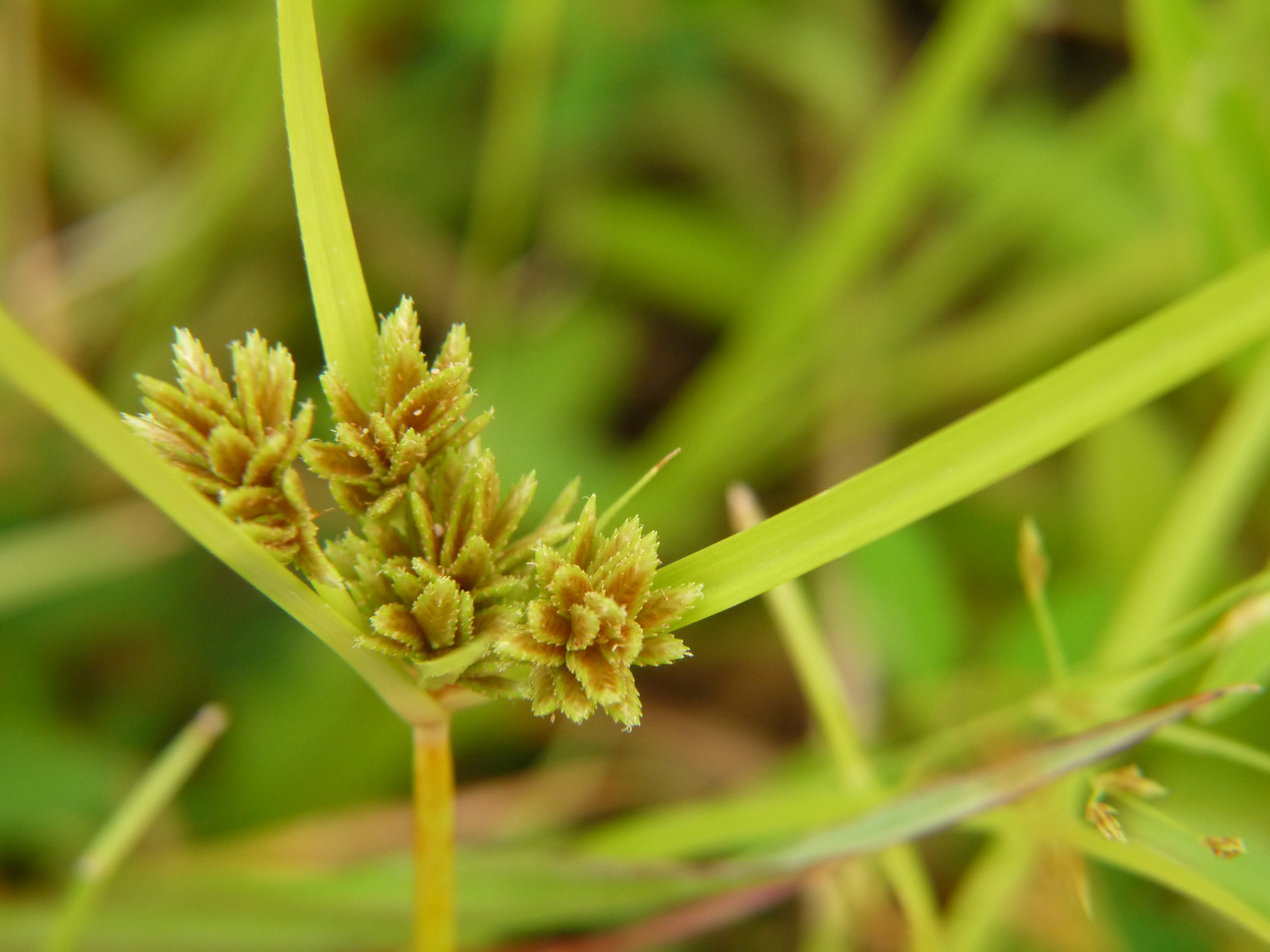

Scientific classification
- Kingdom: Plantae
- Clade: Tracheophytes
- Clade: Angiosperms
- Clade: Monocots
- Clade: Commelinids
- Order: Poales
- Family: Cyperaceae
- Genus: Cyperus
- Species: C. nipponicus

Binomial name
- Cyperus nipponicus Franch. & Sav., 1878

= Cyperus nipponicus =

Species of sedge

Cyperus nipponicus is a species of sedge that is native to parts of south eastern Russia, China and Japan.

== See also ==
- List of Cyperus species
