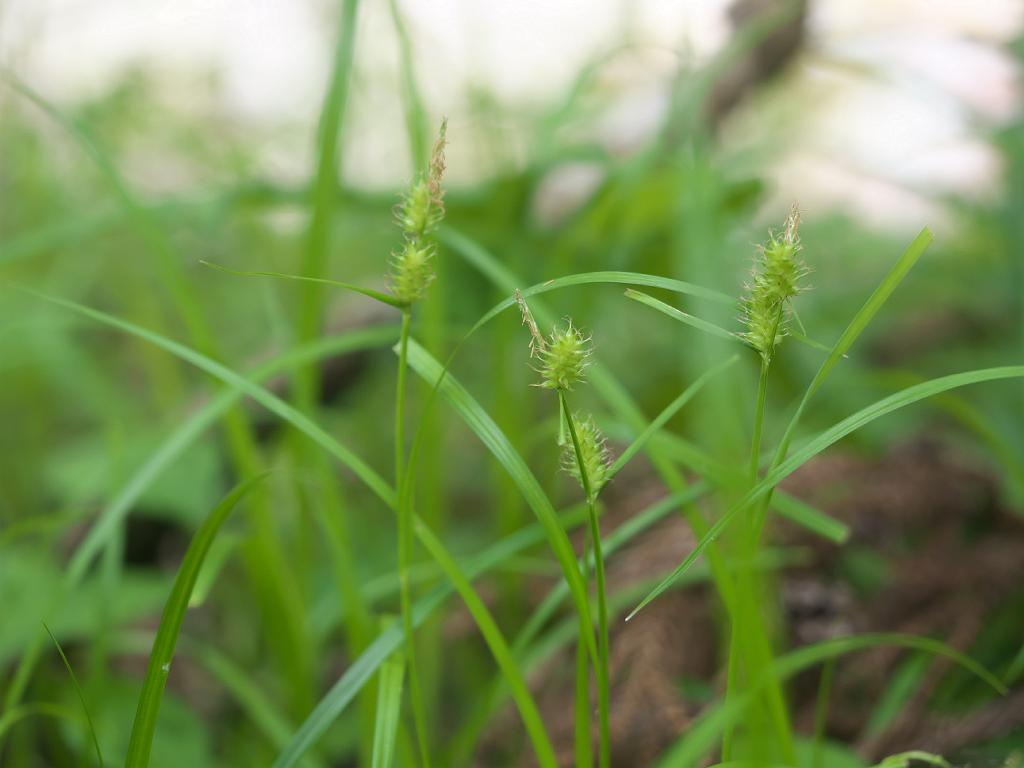

Scientific classification
- Kingdom: Plantae
- Clade: Tracheophytes
- Clade: Angiosperms
- Clade: Monocots
- Clade: Commelinids
- Order: Poales
- Family: Cyperaceae
- Genus: Carex
- Species: C. aphanolepis

Binomial name
- Carex aphanolepis Franch. & Sav.

= Carex aphanolepis =

Species of plant

Carex aphanolepis is a tussock-forming species of perennial sedge in the family of Cyperaceae. It is native to the eastern parts of Asia.

== See also ==
- List of Carex species
