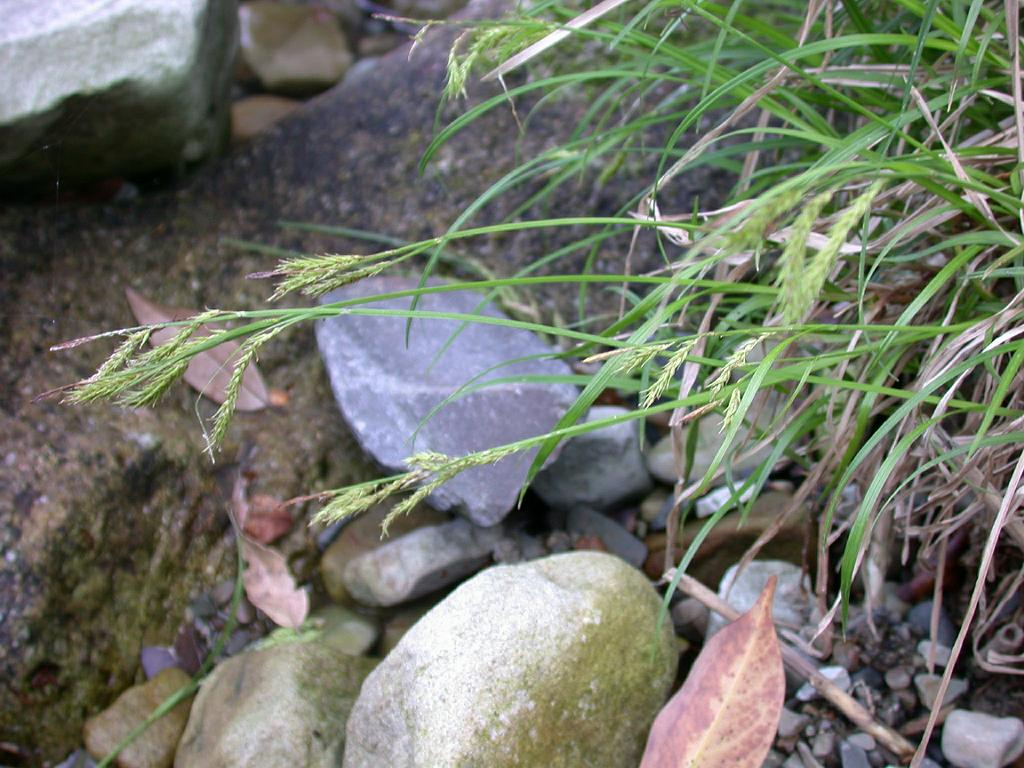

Scientific classification
- Kingdom: Plantae
- Clade: Tracheophytes
- Clade: Angiosperms
- Clade: Monocots
- Clade: Commelinids
- Order: Poales
- Family: Cyperaceae
- Genus: Carex
- Species: C. curvicollis

Binomial name
- Carex curvicollis Franch. & Sav.

= Carex curvicollis =

Species of plant

Carex curvicollis is a tussock-forming species of perennial sedge in the family Cyperaceae. It is native to parts of Japan.

The species was first formally described by the botanists Adrien René Franchet and Ludovic Savatier in 1879 as a part of the work Enumeratio Plantarum in Japonia Sponte Crescentium.

== See also ==
- List of Carex species
