= Carex filipes =

Scientific classification
- Kingdom: Plantae
- Clade: Tracheophytes
- Clade: Angiosperms
- Clade: Monocots
- Clade: Commelinids
- Order: Poales
- Family: Cyperaceae
- Genus: Carex
- Species: C. filipes

Binomial name
- Carex filipes Franch. & Sav.

Species of plant

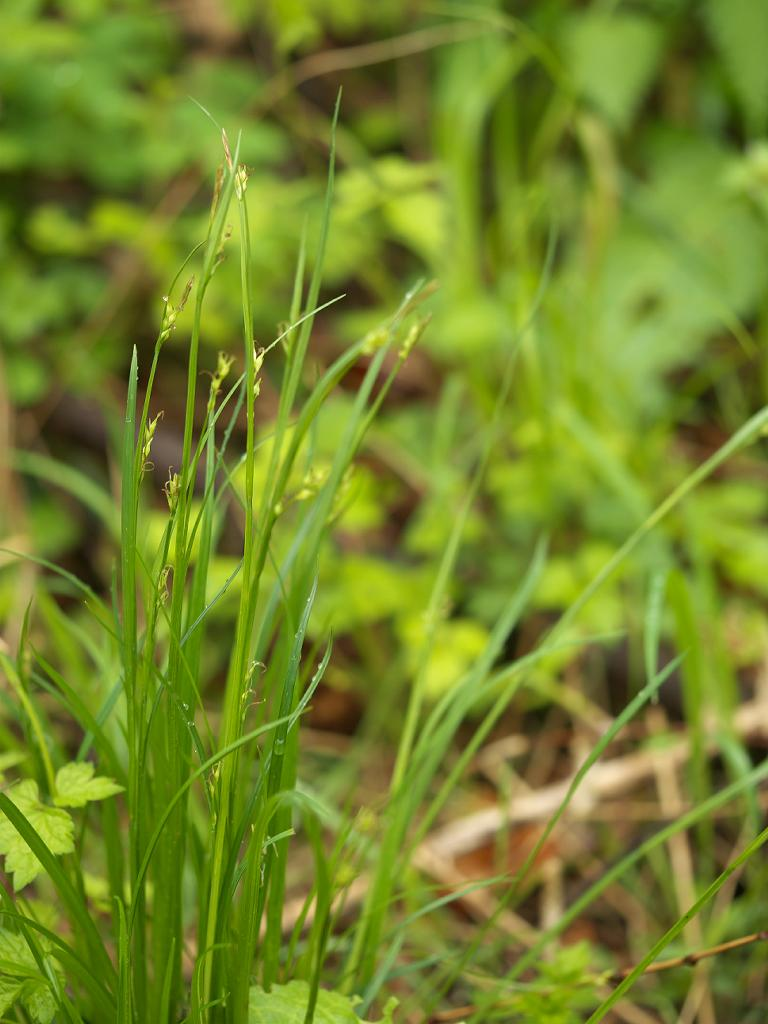
Carex filipes in Japan

Carex filipes, also known as Fishing-rod-like sedge or papillose sedge is a tussock-forming species of perennial sedge in the family Cyperaceae. It is native to Japan and southern parts of China.

== See also ==
- List of Carex species
