= Ptycholoma micantana =

Scientific classification
- Domain: Eukaryota
- Kingdom: Animalia
- Phylum: Arthropoda
- Class: Insecta
- Order: Lepidoptera
- Family: Tortricidae
- Genus: Ptycholoma
- Species: P. micantana

Binomial name
- Ptycholoma micantana (Kennel, 1901)

Synonyms
- Cacoecia micantana Kennel, 1901

Species of moth

Ptycholoma micantana is a species of moth of the family Tortricidae. It is found in China (Heilongjiang), North Korea and Russia (Primorye, Amur). The habitat consists of fir broad-leaved forests, cedar broad-leaved forests and gardens.

Adults are on wing from June to July.

The larvae are polyphagous. They have been recorded feeding on Rosales and Fagales species, as well as Eleutherococcus species.
