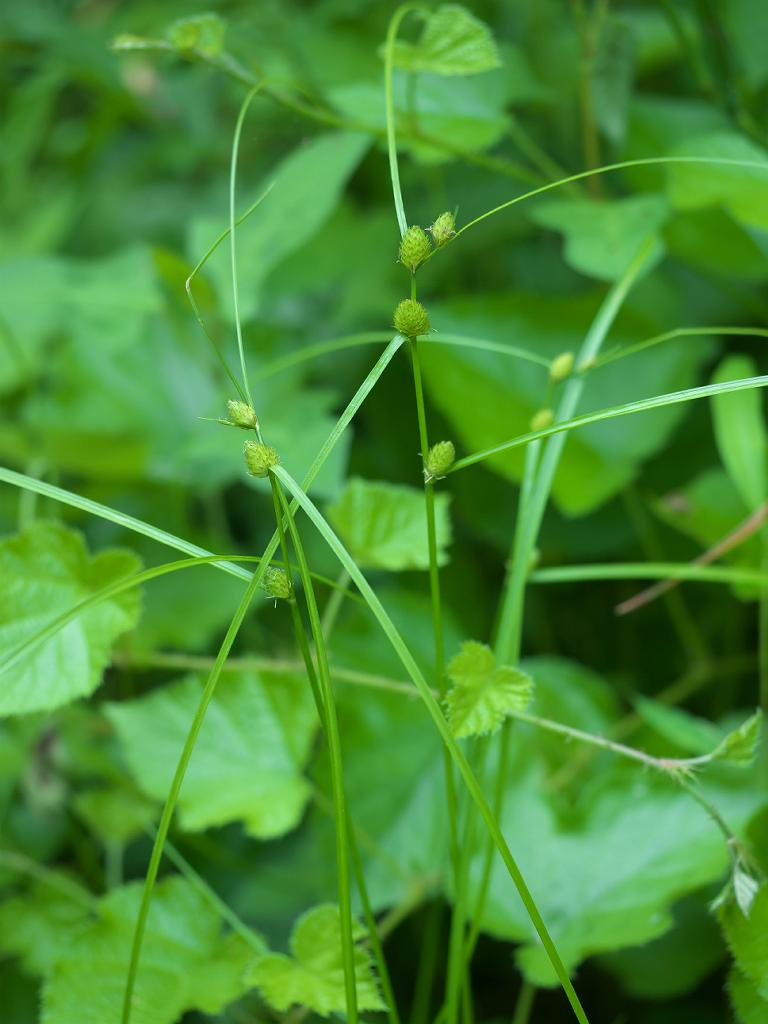
- In Shimane Prefecture, Japan

Scientific classification
- Kingdom: Plantae
- Clade: Embryophytes
- Clade: Tracheophytes
- Clade: Spermatophytes
- Clade: Angiosperms
- Clade: Monocots
- Clade: Commelinids
- Order: Poales
- Family: Cyperaceae
- Genus: Carex
- Species: C. planata

Binomial name
- Carex planata Franch. & Sav.

= Carex planata =

Species of plant

Carex planata is a tussock-forming species of perennial sedge in the family Cyperaceae. It is native to parts of Japan.

== See also ==
- List of Carex species
