= Carex omiana =

Scientific classification
- Kingdom: Plantae
- Clade: Tracheophytes
- Clade: Angiosperms
- Clade: Monocots
- Clade: Commelinids
- Order: Poales
- Family: Cyperaceae
- Genus: Carex
- Species: C. omiana

Binomial name
- Carex omiana Franch. & Sav.

Species of plant

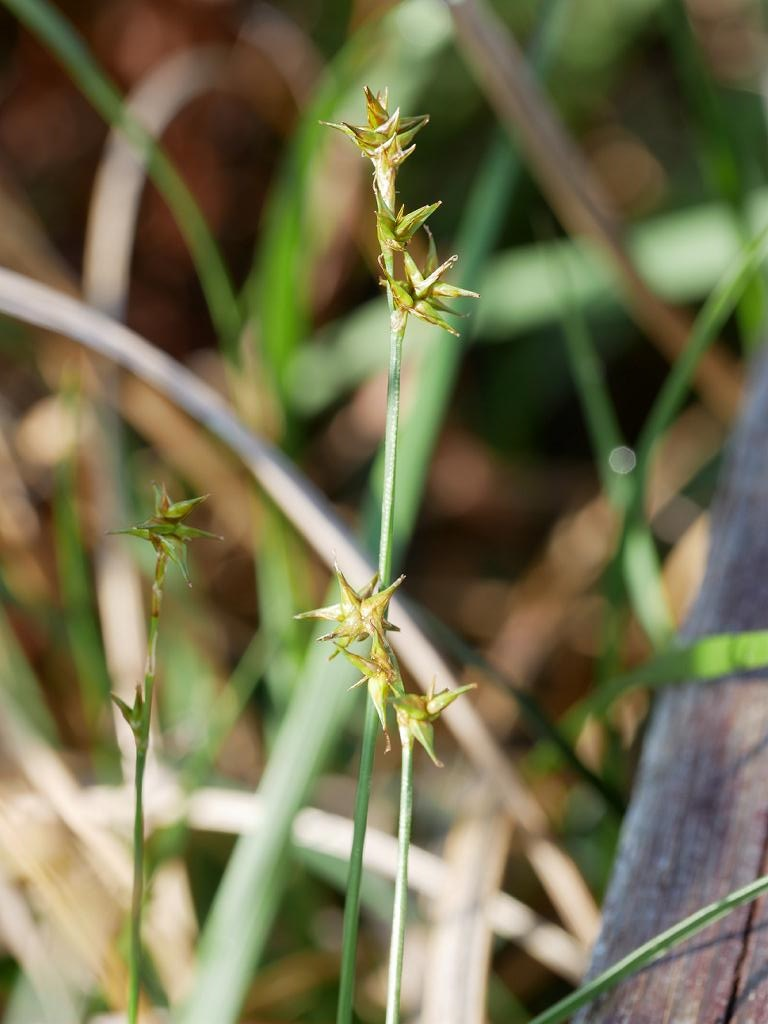
Carex omiana

Carex omiana, also known as suwon sedge, is a tussock-forming species of perennial sedge in the family Cyperaceae. It is native to north eastern parts of China, Japan and the Kuril Islands.

== See also ==
- List of Carex species
