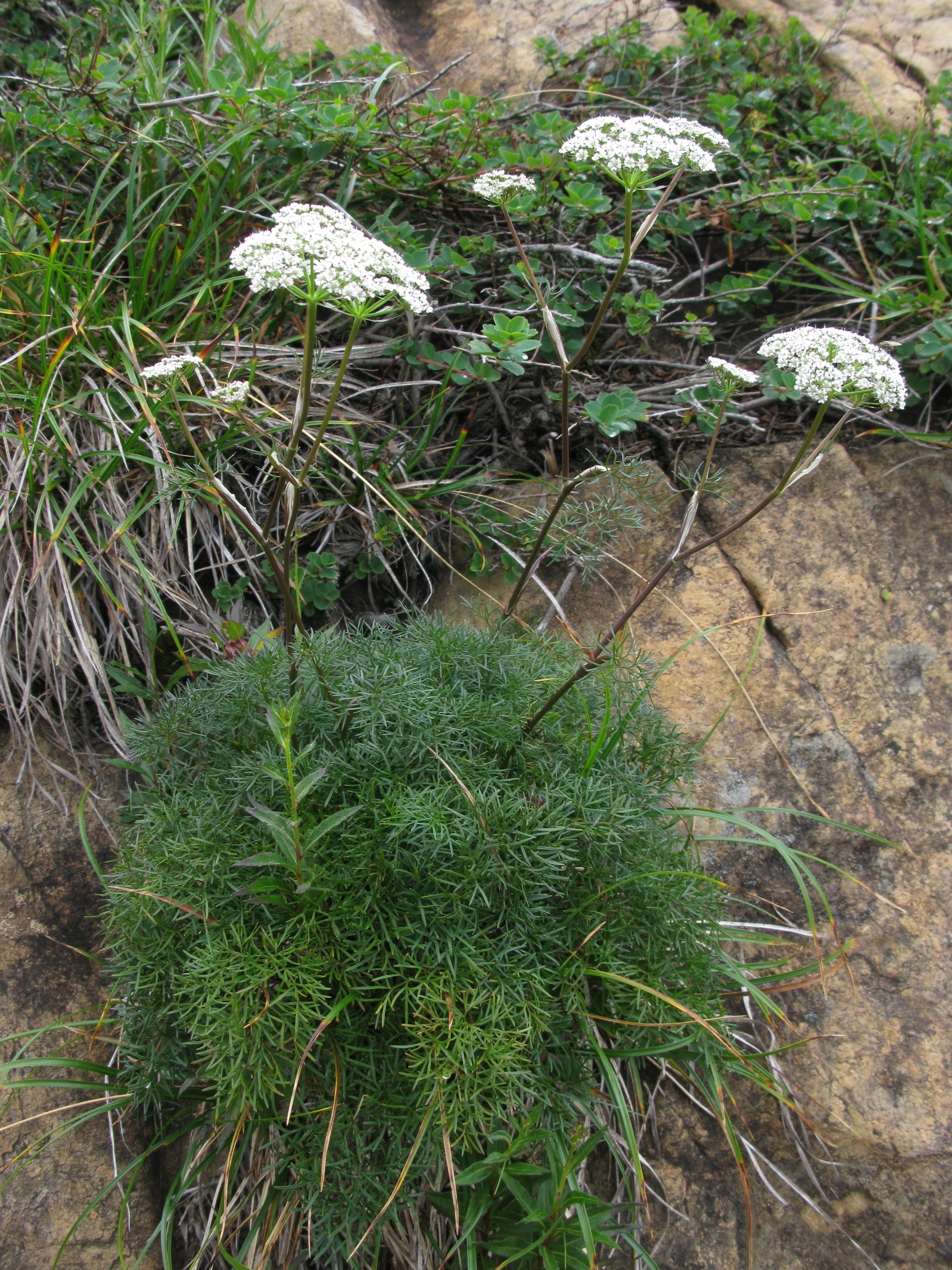

Scientific classification
- Kingdom: Plantae
- Clade: Tracheophytes
- Clade: Angiosperms
- Clade: Eudicots
- Clade: Asterids
- Order: Apiales
- Family: Apiaceae
- Genus: Rupiphila; Pimenov & Lavrova
- Species: R. tachiroei

Binomial name
- Rupiphila tachiroei (Franch. & Sav.) Pimenov & Lavrova

Synonyms
- Synonymy: Carum bretschneideri H.Wolff; Carum seselifolium H.Wolff; Carum wolffianum Fedde ex H.Wolff; Cnidium affine H.Wolff; Cnidium filisectum Nakai & Kitag.; Cnidium limprichtii H.Wolff; Cnidium tachiroei (Franch. & Sav.) Makino; Cnidium wolffii M.Hiroe in Umbell.; Ligusticum filisectum (Nakai & Kitag.) M.Hiroe; Ligusticum koreanum H.Wolff in Repert.; Ligusticum tachiroei var. filisectum (Nakai & Kitag.) S.Y.He & W.T.Fan; Ligusticum tachiroei (Franch. & Sav.) M.Hiroe & Constance; Seseli tachiroei Franch. & Sav. (1878); Tilingia filisecta (Nakai & Kitag.) Nakai & Kitag.; Tilingia limprichtii (H.Wolff) Leute; Tilingia tachiroei (Franch. & Sav.) Kitag.

= Rupiphila =

Genus of flowering plants

Rupiphila is a genus of flowering plants in the family Apiaceae. It includes a single species, Rupiphila tachiroei, a biennial or perennial native to east-central and northern China, Mongolia, the southern Russian Far East (Primorsky Krai), Korea, and Japan.
