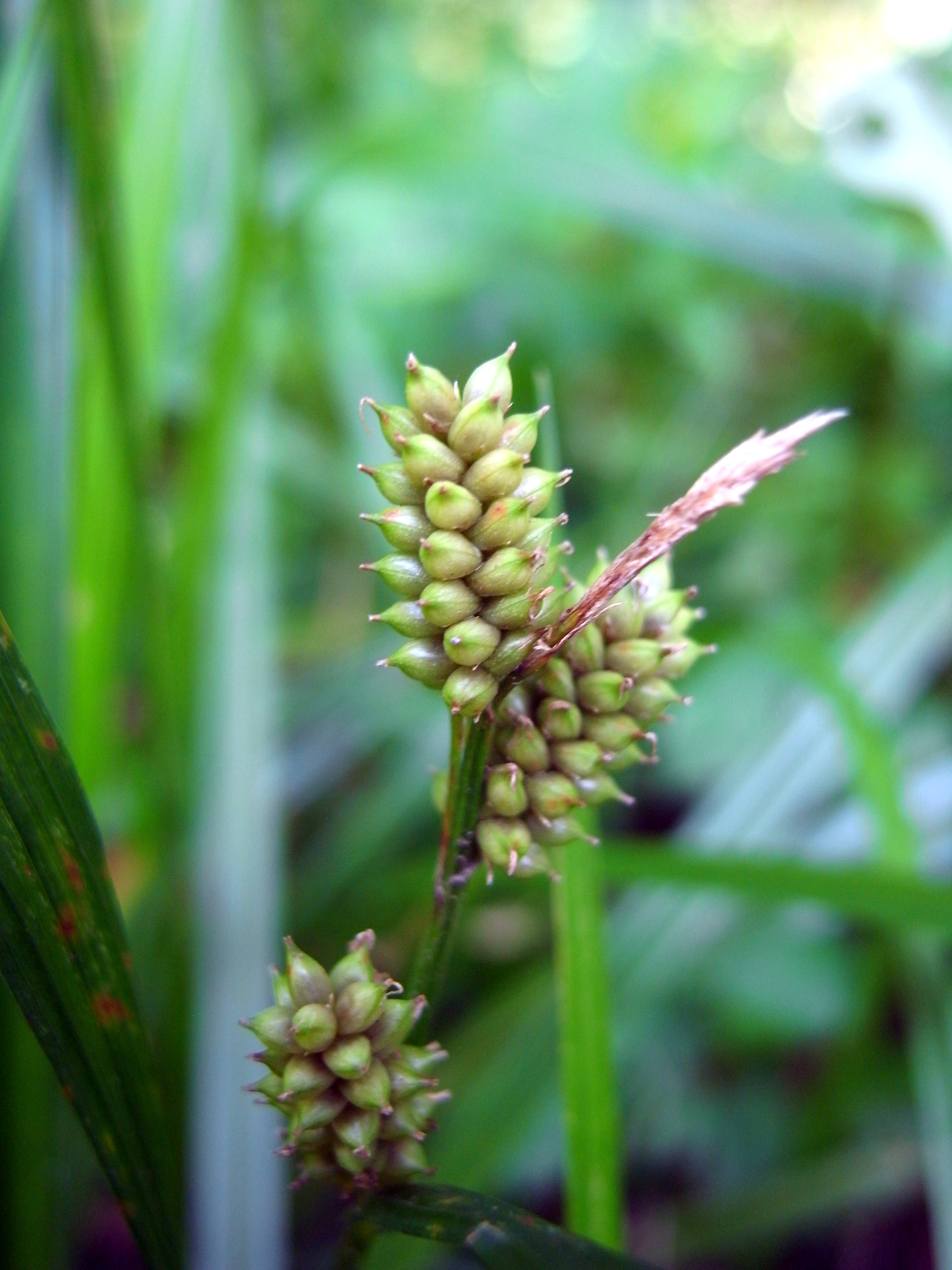

Scientific classification
- Kingdom: Plantae
- Clade: Tracheophytes
- Clade: Angiosperms
- Clade: Monocots
- Clade: Commelinids
- Order: Poales
- Family: Cyperaceae
- Genus: Carex
- Species: C. dickinsii

Binomial name
- Carex dickinsii Franch. & Sav.

= Carex dickinsii =

Dickins' sedge

Species of plant

Carex dickinsii, also known as Dickins' sedge or chao xian tai cao in pinyin, is a tussock-forming species of perennial sedge in the family Cyperaceae. It is native to parts of Japan, Taiwan and south-eastern China.

== Description ==
The sedge has a rhizome and forms slender stems that arise from underground. It forms 20 to 70 cm (7.9 to 27.6 in) long culms that have a triangular cross-section and have a rough texture on top and are smooth underneath. The culms have yellow to brown coloured sheaths at there base. The stiff and flat leaves have a width of 4 to 8 mm (0.16 to 0.31 in) and are the same length or longer than the culms. The leaves have sheathed and transverse nodes that are compartmentalied between the veins. It has leaflike bracts that appear in a whorl underneath the inflorescences. The flower spikes usually occur in groups of three with a lateral female spike and a club shapeed terminal male spike that is 1.5 to 2 cm (0.59 to 0.79 in) in length.

== Taxonomy ==
The species was first described by the botanists Adrien René Franchet and Ludovic Savatier in 1878 as a part of the work Enumeratio Plantarum in Japonia Sponte Crescentium

It has one synonym; Carex coreana described by Liberty Hyde Bailey in 1889.

== Distribution ==
The sedge is found in temperate areas of eastern Asia, from Japan in the north, Korea and the Fujian province of Chine in the south.

== See also ==
- List of Carex species
