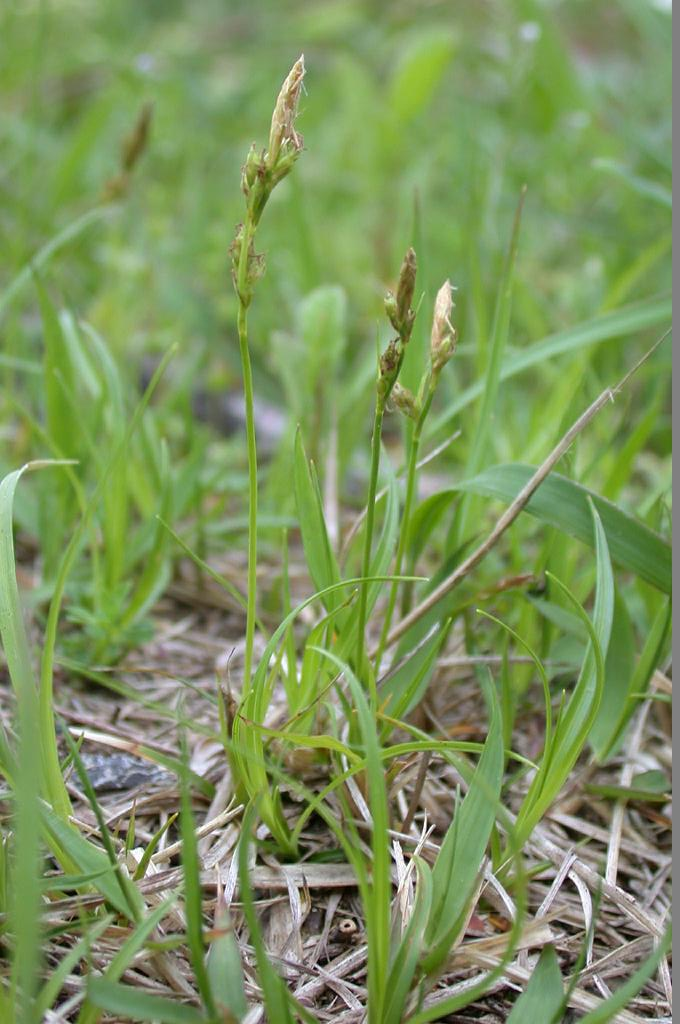

Scientific classification
- Kingdom: Plantae
- Clade: Tracheophytes
- Clade: Angiosperms
- Clade: Monocots
- Clade: Commelinids
- Order: Poales
- Family: Cyperaceae
- Genus: Carex
- Species: C. nervata

Binomial name
- Carex nervata Franch. & Sav.

= Carex nervata =

Species of plant

Carex nervata, also known as nerved-mitra sedge, is a tussock-forming species of perennial sedge in the family Cyperaceae. It is native to far eastern parts of Russia, Mongolia, Manchuria, Japan and Korea.

== See also ==
- List of Carex species
