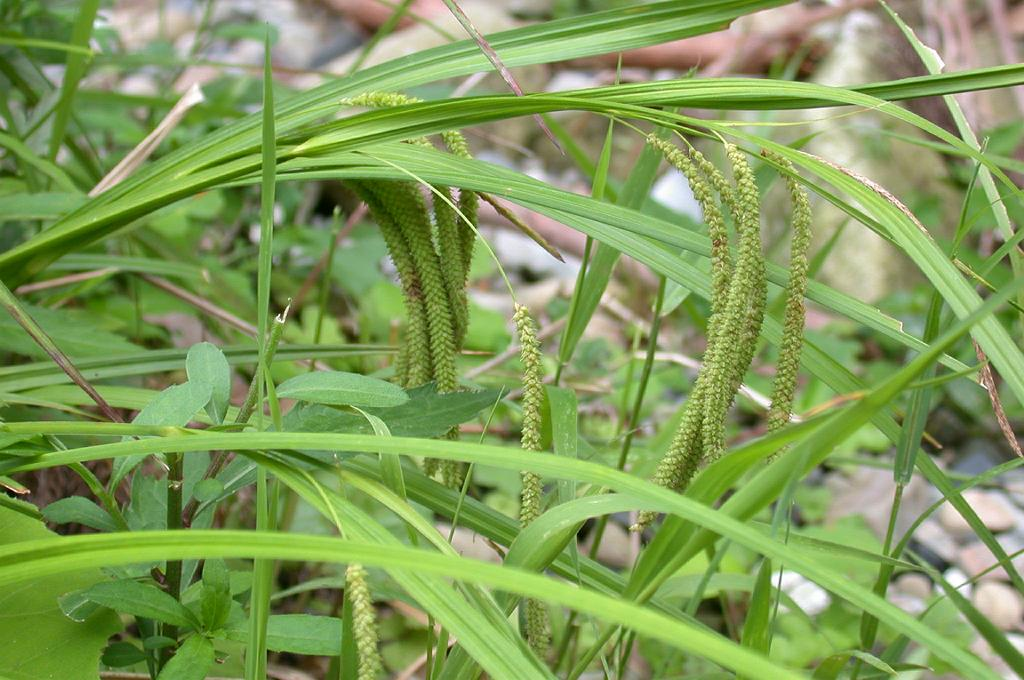

Scientific classification
- Kingdom: Plantae
- Clade: Tracheophytes
- Clade: Angiosperms
- Clade: Monocots
- Clade: Commelinids
- Order: Poales
- Family: Cyperaceae
- Genus: Carex
- Species: C. kiotensis

Binomial name
- Carex kiotensis Franch. & Sav.

Synonyms
- List: Carex fuscescens Boeckeler; Carex guffroyana H.Lév. & Vaniot; Carex jizogatakensis H.Lév. & Vaniot; Carex longispicata Hayata; Carex manongarivensis Cherm.; Carex phaeopoda Ohwi; Carex prescottiana var. fuscescens (Boeckeler) Kük.; Carex prescottiana var. kiotensis (Franch. & Sav.) Kük.

= Carex kiotensis =

Species of plant

Carex kiotensis is a tussock-forming species of perennial sedge in the family Cyperaceae. It is native to parts of Japan and Taiwan.

== See also ==
- List of Carex species
