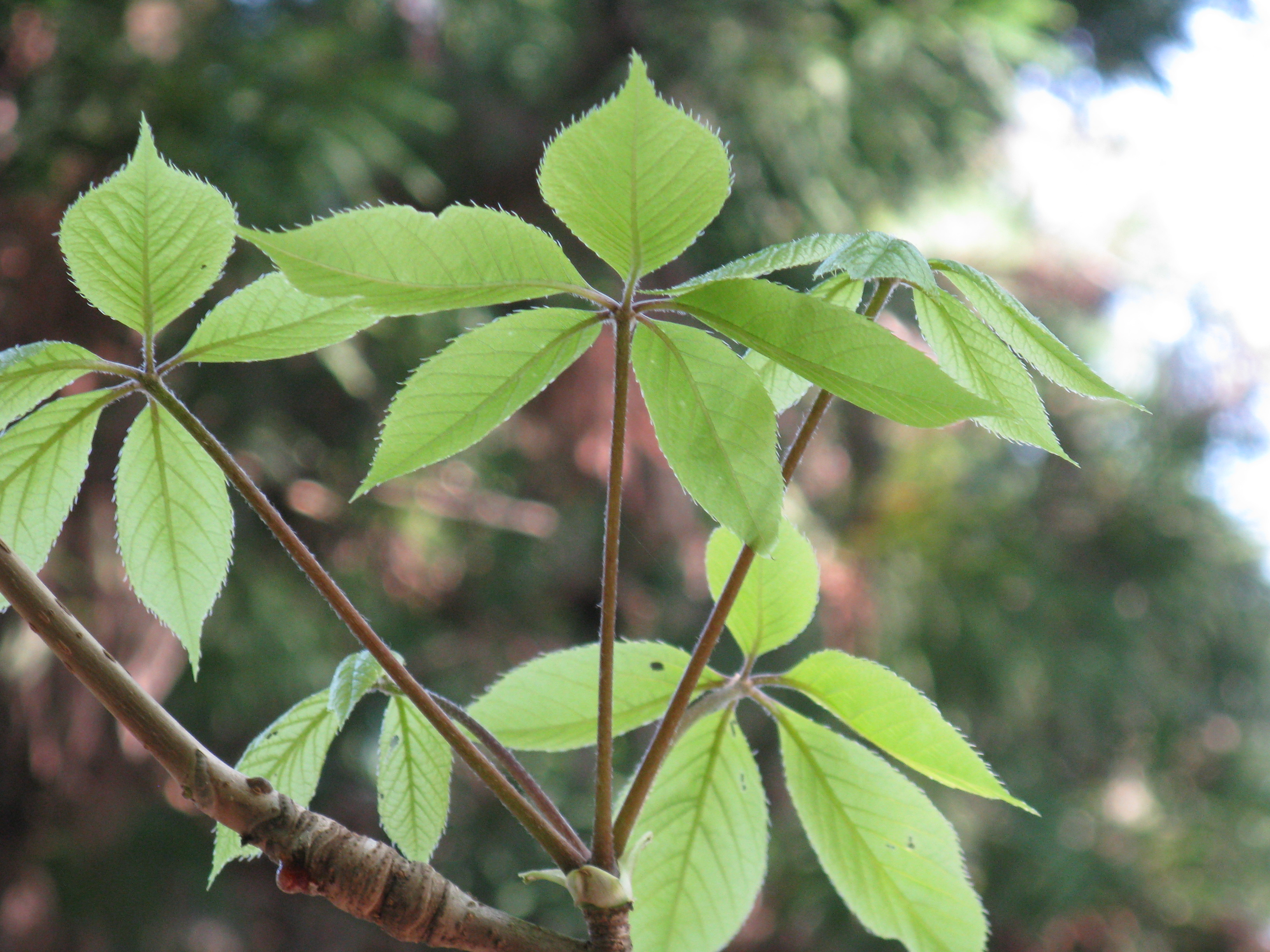

Scientific classification
- Kingdom: Plantae
- Clade: Tracheophytes
- Clade: Angiosperms
- Clade: Eudicots
- Clade: Asterids
- Order: Apiales
- Family: Araliaceae
- Genus: Chengiopanax
- Species: C. sciadophylloides

Binomial name
- Chengiopanax sciadophylloides (Franch. & Sav.) C.B.Shang & J.Y.Huang

Synonyms
- Synonymy: Acanthopanax sciadophylloides Franch. & Sav.; Eleutherococcus sciadophylloides (Franch. & Sav.) H.Ohashi; Kalopanax sciadophylloides (Franch. & Sav.) Harms

= Chengiopanax sciadophylloides =

Species of flowering plant

Chengiopanax sciadophylloides is a flowering tree in the family Araliaceae native to Japan. Previously included in the genus Eleutherococcus, it is distinguished from other members of that genus by not having spines or prickles and ITS sequence data confirmed the separation.

== Chemistry ==
Chengiopanax sciadophylloides has been found to be a specific hyperaccumulator of manganese even in soils not contaminated with excessive amounts of manganese. In wild plants manganese concentrations of up to 23 grams per kilogram (0.37 oz/lb) of dried leaf have been analyzed.

After the Fukushima Daiichi nuclear disaster in March 2011 it was found that Chengiopanax sciadophylloides accumulated the radioactive isotope Caesium-137 to concentrations above the human consumption guideline of 100 becquerels per kilogram of fresh weight even as far away as Nagano and Iwate Prefectures. Analysis of leaves taken from Chengiopanax sciadophylloides in August and October 2013 from a forest 37 kilometres (23 mi) northwest of the Fukushima Dai-ichi Nuclear Power Plant found a mean concentration of 28,100 becquerels per kilogram of dry weight, over three times those of other trees. They also accumulated the non-radioactive Caesium-133 more than other trees.

== Uses ==
Known as koshiabura (コシアブラ), gonzetsu and gonzetsunoki in Japanese cuisine, it is foraged in the wild in spring for the young leaves as sansai ("mountain vegetables"). It is called the "queen of sansai" and often used in tempura, but also popular in a range of dishes. The highest grade of buds is as small as a calligraphy brush, and thus called fude ha ("leaf of brush").

A decoction of the roots, tea of the root bark, and tea of the leaf were used in Niigata Prefecture as a folk remedy.

A lacquer-like coating material called kinshitsu (金漆) used to be made from the sap. The polyacetylenes in the plant sap were polymerised by sunlight to produce the hard resin varnish. Two other members of the Araliaceae, Dendropanax trifidus and Gamblea innovans, may also have been sources for this lacquer in Japan. The lacquer was used to prevent corrosion of suits of armour and helmets, with related species providing a similar lacquer used in China during the Tang dynasty and in Korea.

The wood is used for general construction and for chopsticks. The wood is regarded as auspicious and is valued in the Sasano-Bori doll carving tradition in Yonezawa (along with the wood of the Pagoda Tree) for its strength and flexibility.
