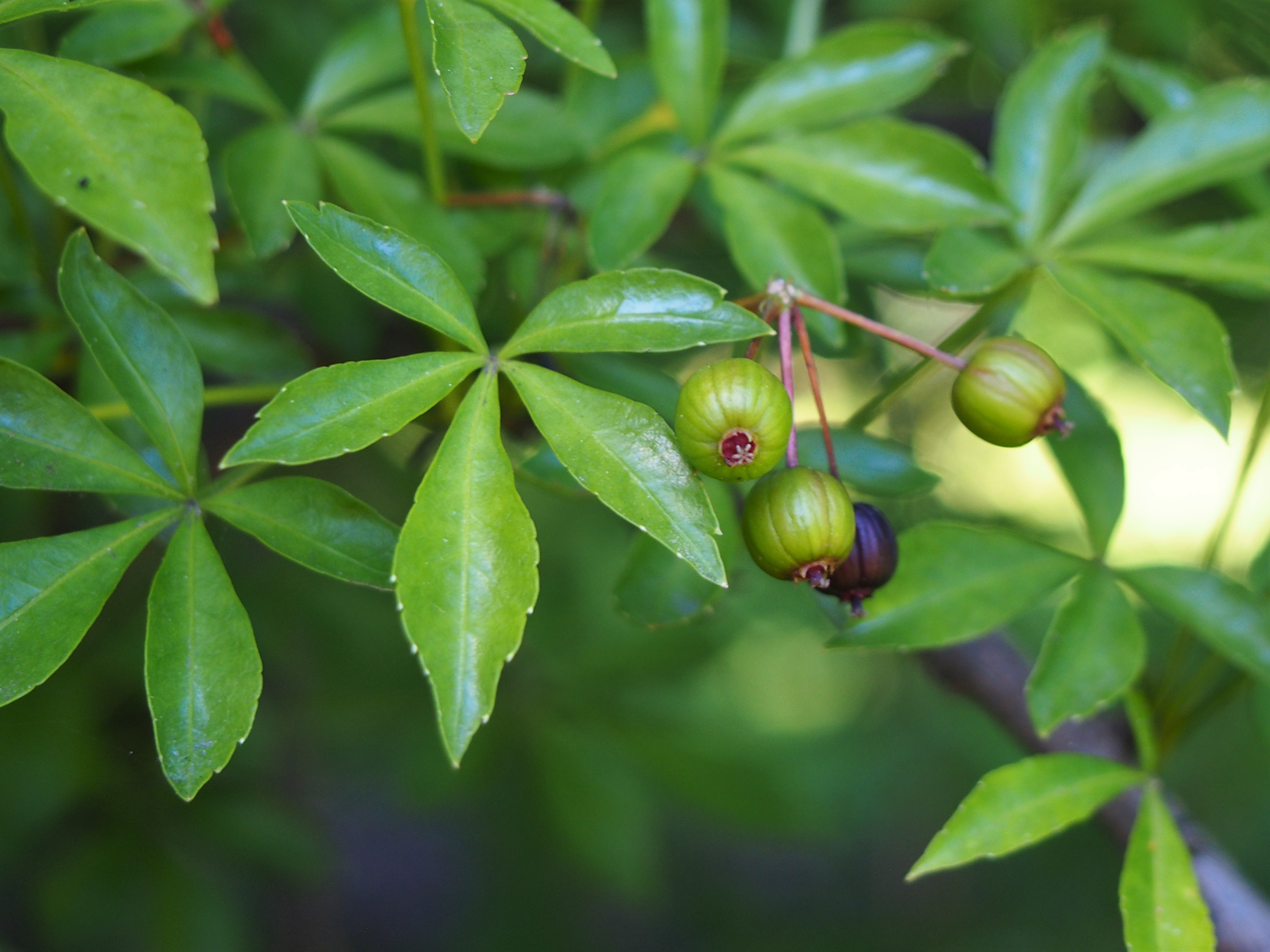
- Leaves and fruit
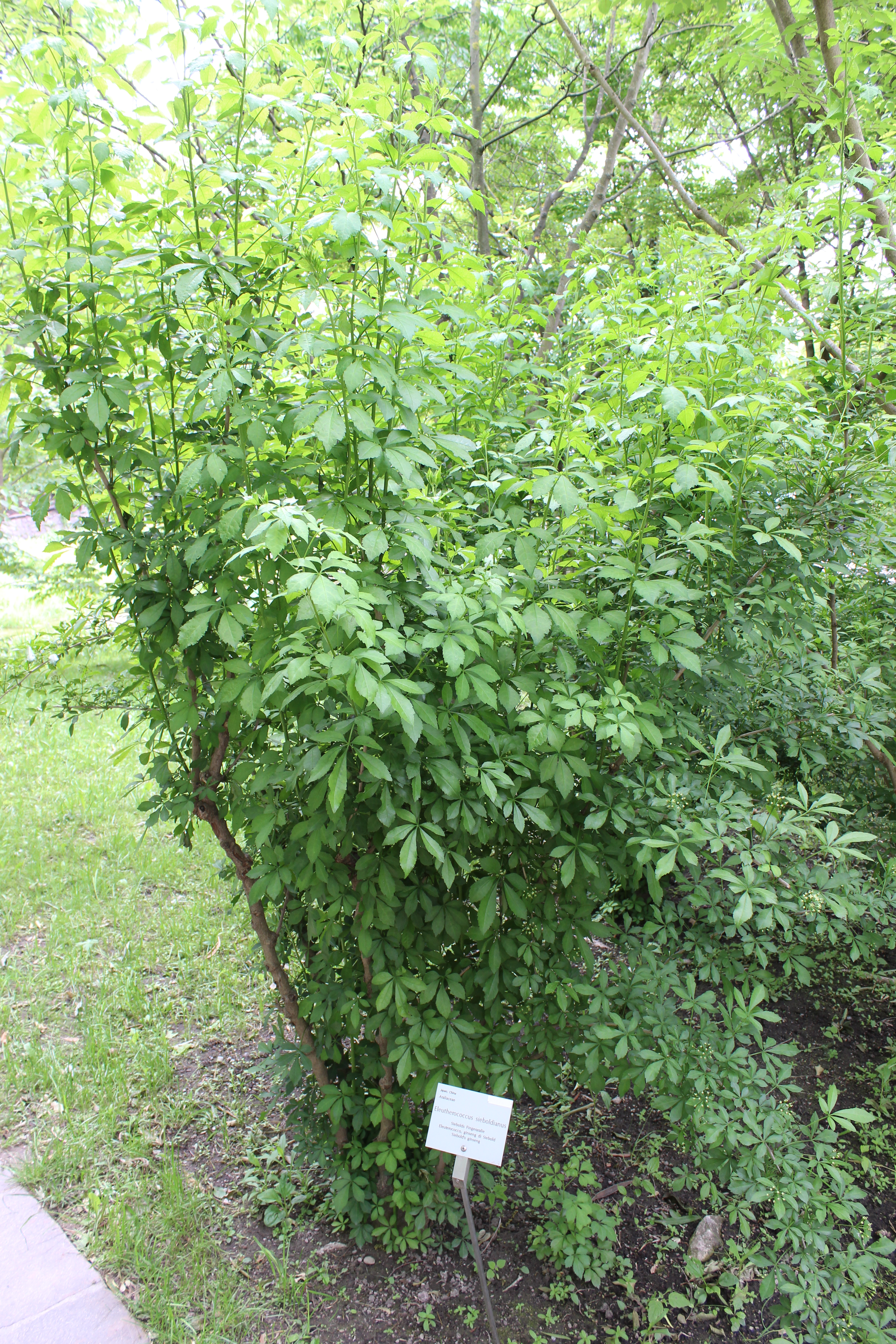
- At the Trauttmansdorff Castle Gardens in Italy

Scientific classification
- Kingdom: Plantae
- Clade: Embryophytes
- Clade: Tracheophytes
- Clade: Spermatophytes
- Clade: Angiosperms
- Clade: Eudicots
- Clade: Asterids
- Order: Apiales
- Family: Araliaceae
- Genus: Eleutherococcus
- Species: E. sieboldianus

Binomial name
- Eleutherococcus sieboldianus (Makino) Koidz.

Synonyms
- Homotypic Synonyms: Acanthopanax sieboldianus Makino; Heterotypic Synonyms: Acanthopanax pentaphyllus var. variegatus (G.Nicholson) Rehder; Acanthopanax sieboldianus var. variegatus (G.Nicholson) Rehder; Aralia pentaphylla var. variegata G.Nicholson; Eleutherococcus japonicus var. variegata (G.Nicholson) Nakai; Eleutherococcus sieboldianus f. variegatus (G.Nicholson) S.Y.Hu

= Eleutherococcus sieboldianus =

Species of flowering plant

Eleutherococcus sieboldianus, the five-fingered aralia or fiveleaf aralia, is a species of flowering plant in the family Araliaceae. It is native to Anhui province in China, and has been introduced to Korea, Japan and the United States. A variegated form is available which only reaches 8 ft (2.4 m).
