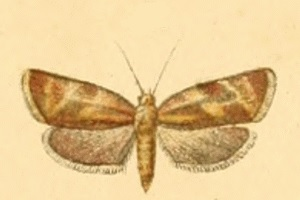

Scientific classification
- Domain: Eukaryota
- Kingdom: Animalia
- Phylum: Arthropoda
- Class: Insecta
- Order: Lepidoptera
- Family: Tortricidae
- Genus: Ptycholoma
- Species: P. erschoffi

Binomial name
- Ptycholoma erschoffi (Christoph, 1877)

Synonyms
- Tortrix erschoffi Christoph, 1877

= Ptycholoma erschoffi =

Species of moth

Ptycholoma erschoffi is a species of moth of the family Tortricidae. It is found in the south-eastern part of European Russia, the Caucasus, Transcaucasia, Transbaikalia, Turkmenistan, Asia Minor and Iran.

The wingspan is 19–25 mm for females and 15–17 mm for males. Adults are on wing from May to June.

The larvae feed on Malus, Prunus and Rosa species. They can be found from April to May.
