= Eleutherococcus setulosus =

Conservation status
- Endangered (IUCN 3.1)

Scientific classification
- Kingdom: Plantae
- Clade: Tracheophytes
- Clade: Angiosperms
- Clade: Eudicots
- Clade: Asterids
- Order: Apiales
- Family: Araliaceae
- Genus: Eleutherococcus
- Species: E. setulosus

Binomial name
- Eleutherococcus setulosus (Franchet) S. Y. Hu

Synonyms
- Acanthopanax setulosus Franchet; Acanthopanax zhejiangensis X. J. Xue & S. T. Fang; Eleutherococcus asperatus'' (Franch. & Sav.) Koidz.; Eleutherococcus pseudosetulosus C. H. Kim & B. Y. Sun; Eleutherococcus zhejiangensis (X. J. Xue & S. T. Fang) H. Ohashi

Species of flowering plant

Eleutherococcus setulosus is a plant species in the family Araliaceae. It is native to the Chinese provinces of Anhui, Gansu, Sichuan and Zhejiang.

The species is a shrub up to 5 m (16 ft) tall, with densely bristled branches and with prickles along the base of the petioles. Flowers are born in axillary umbels.
