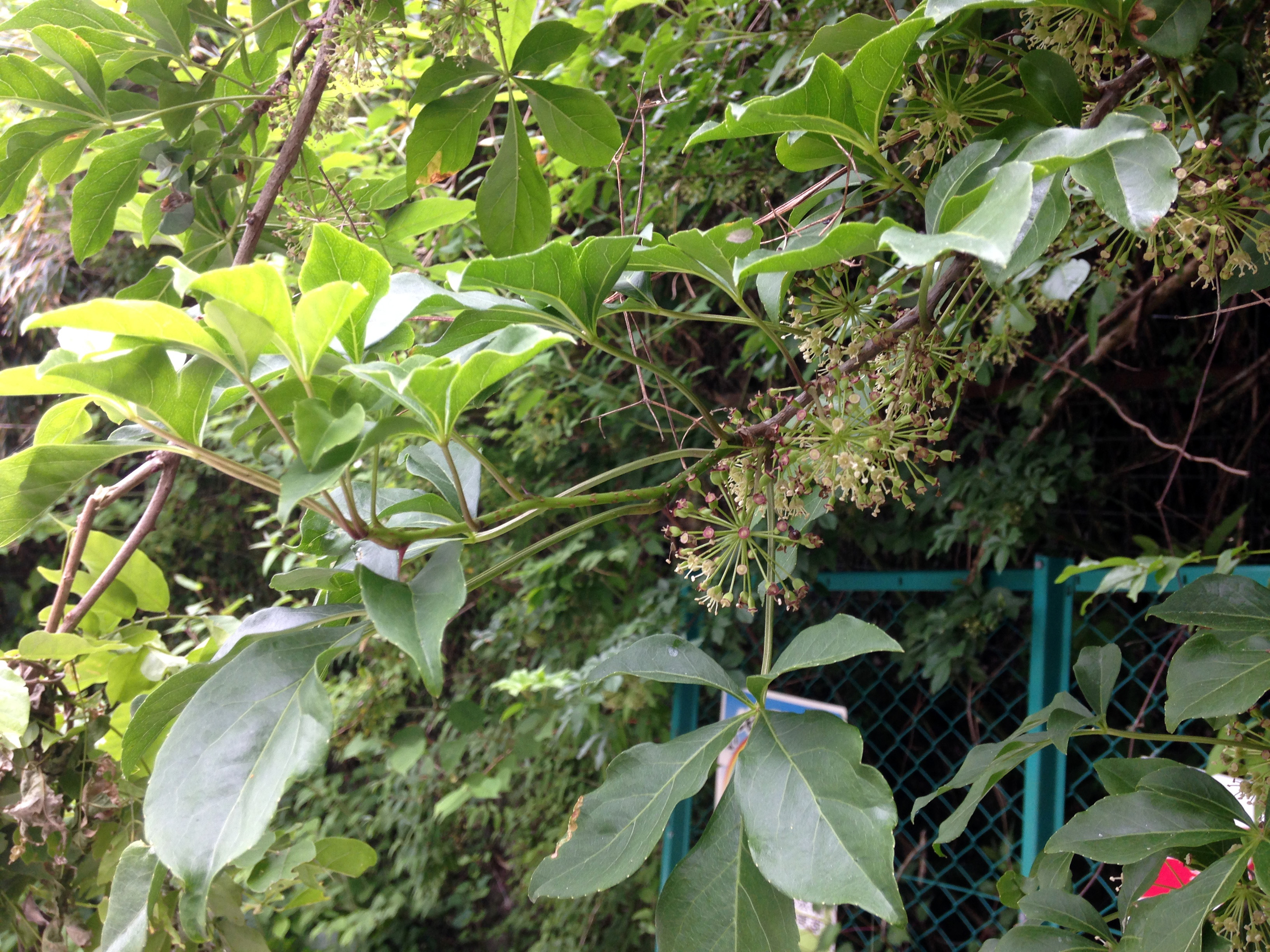

Scientific classification
- Kingdom: Plantae
- Clade: Tracheophytes
- Clade: Angiosperms
- Clade: Eudicots
- Clade: Asterids
- Order: Apiales
- Family: Araliaceae
- Genus: Eleutherococcus
- Species: E. spinosus

Binomial name
- Eleutherococcus spinosus (L.f.) S.Y.Hu

Synonyms
- Acanthopanax spinosus (L.f.) Miq.

= Eleutherococcus spinosus =

Species of flowering plant

Eleutherococcus spinosus is a species of flowering shrub in the ginseng family (Araliaceae). It native to Japan, where it is common species found on the island of Honshu south of Iwate Prefecture. Its natural habitat is in areas of forest edges.

Eleutherococcus spinosus is a deciduous shrub with thorny branches. Its leaves are compound with five leaflets. These leaflets are thickened, 2–7 cm (0.79–2.76 in) long, and have an acute to obtuse apex. In May it produces white umbels of flowers, born on short spurs. Its fruits are black are ripen around July.
