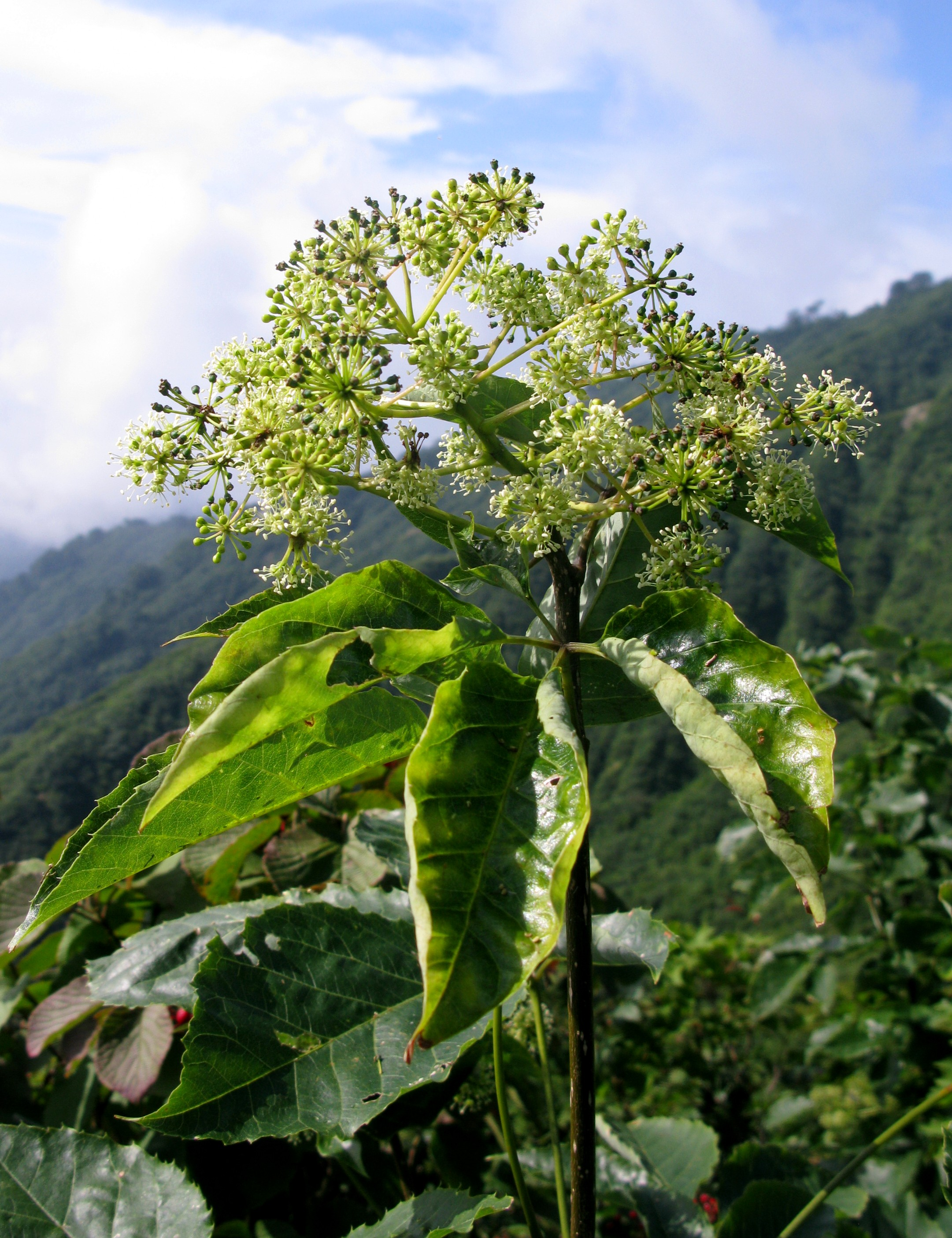
- Chengiopanax sciadophylloides

Scientific classification
- Kingdom: Plantae
- Clade: Embryophytes
- Clade: Tracheophytes
- Clade: Angiosperms
- Clade: Eudicots
- Clade: Asterids
- Order: Apiales
- Family: Araliaceae
- Subfamily: Aralioideae
- Genus: Chengiopanax; C.B.Shang & J.Y.Huang

Species
- See text

= Chengiopanax =

Genus of flowering plants

Chengiopanax is a small genus of flowering plants in the family Araliaceae, native to China and Japan. Chengiopanax sciadophylloides is known to be a hyperaccumulator of manganese.

== Species ==
Currently accepted species include:

- Chengiopanax fargesii (Franch.) C.B.Shang & J.Y.Huang – China
- Chengiopanax sciadophylloides (Franch. & Sav.) C.B.Shang & J.Y.Huang – Japan
