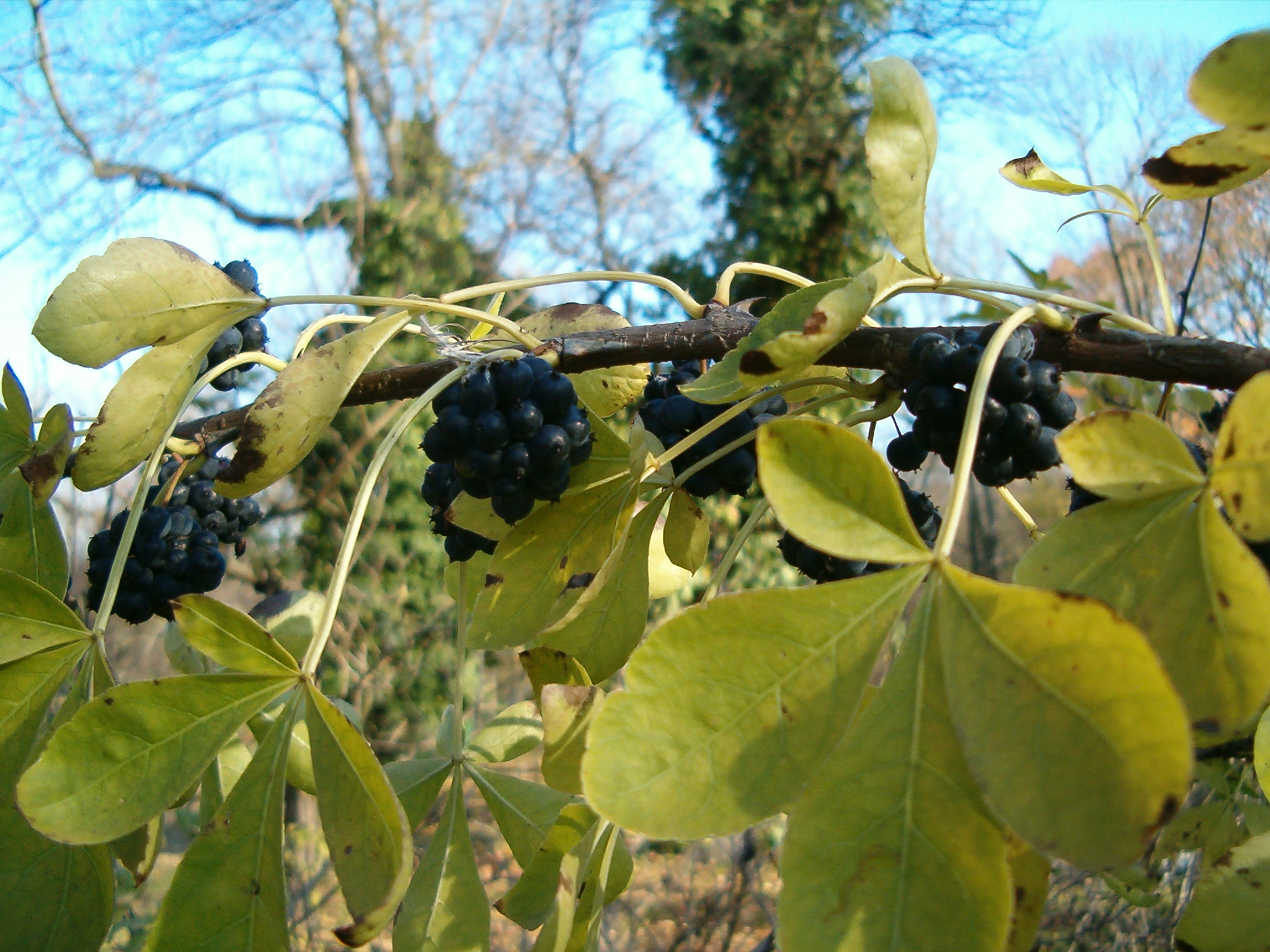

Scientific classification
- Kingdom: Plantae
- Clade: Tracheophytes
- Clade: Angiosperms
- Clade: Eudicots
- Clade: Asterids
- Order: Apiales
- Family: Araliaceae
- Genus: Eleutherococcus
- Species: E. gracilistylus

Binomial name
- Eleutherococcus gracilistylus (W.W.Sm.) S.Y.Hu

Synonyms
- Acanthopanax gracilistylus W.W.Sm.

= Eleutherococcus gracilistylus =

Species of flowering plant

Eleutherococcus gracilistylus, also known as Acanthopanax gracilistylus, is deciduous plant with dark blue berries. It is considered a medicinal herb with significant effects. A widely used Chinese plant, it is in the family Araliaceae, and mainly grows at an altitude of around 3000 m. It is also found in Gaoligongshan Nature Reserve in Yunnan Province, China. It is widely distributed in China and has been used as a life-saving medicine against severe cases of paralysis, arthritis and liver disease; several experiments were carried out in 2003.
