= Ptycholoma lata =

Scientific classification
- Domain: Eukaryota
- Kingdom: Animalia
- Phylum: Arthropoda
- Class: Insecta
- Order: Lepidoptera
- Family: Tortricidae
- Genus: Ptycholoma
- Species: P. lata

Binomial name
- Ptycholoma lata L.S. Chen & Jinbo, 2009

Species of moth

Ptycholoma lata is a species of moth of the family Tortricidae. It is found in Hunan province in southern China.
