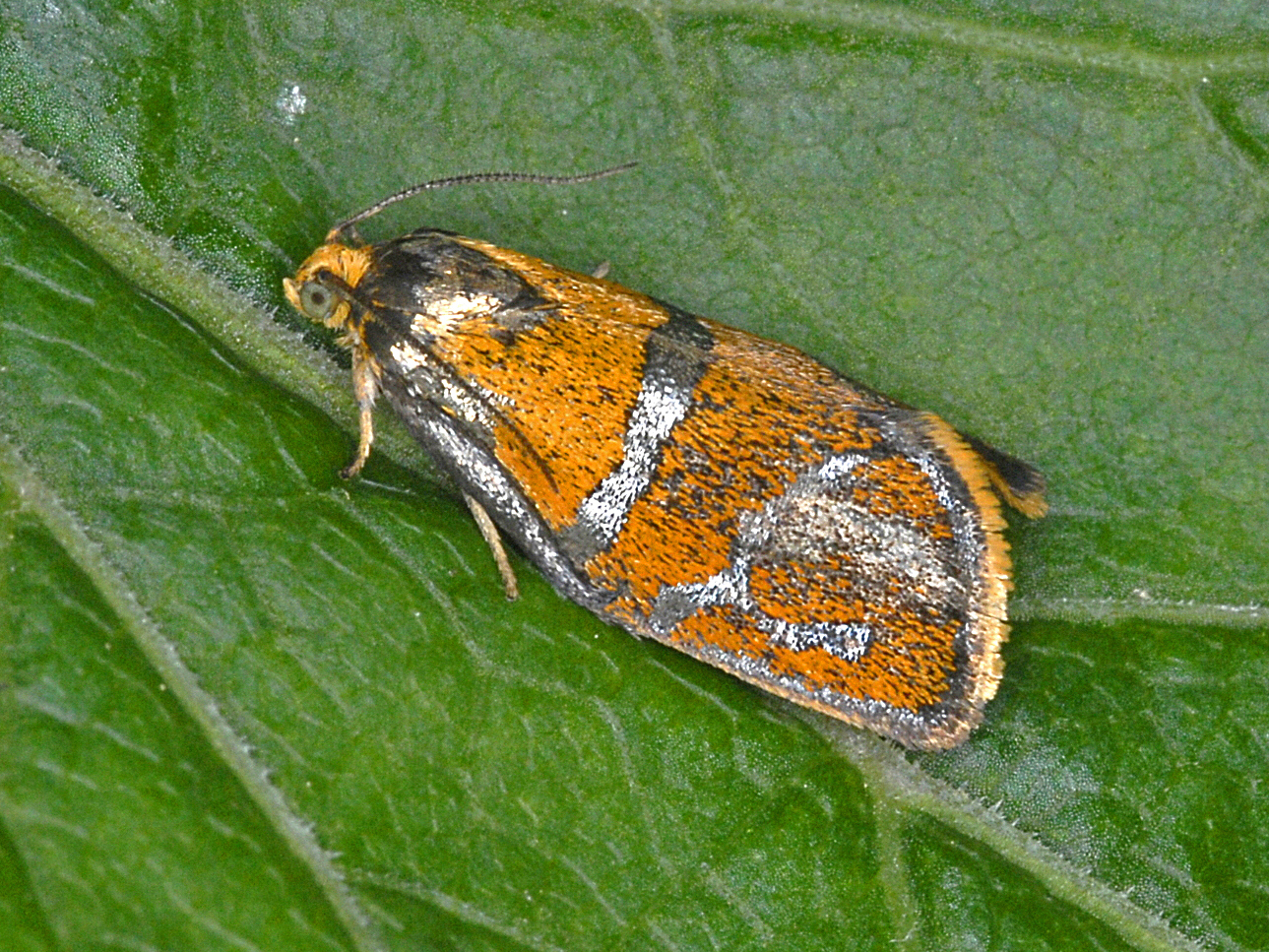
- Adult of Ptycholoma lecheana

Scientific classification
- Kingdom: Animalia
- Phylum: Arthropoda
- Class: Insecta
- Order: Lepidoptera
- Family: Tortricidae
- Tribe: Archipini
- Genus: Ptycholoma; Stephens, 1829

Synonyms
- Ptychaloma Diakonoff, 1939

= Ptycholoma =

Genus of tortrix moths

Ptycholoma is a genus of moths in the tribe Archipini.

== Species ==
- Ptycholoma erschoffi (Christoph, 1877)
- Ptycholoma imitator (Walsingham, 1900)
- Ptycholoma lata L.S. Chen & Jinbo, 2009
- Ptycholoma lecheana (Linnaeus, 1758)
- Ptycholoma micantana (Kennel, 1901)

== Former species ==
- Ptycholoma circumclusna (Linnaeus, 1758)
- Ptycholoma peritana (Clemens, 1860)
- Ptycholoma plumbeolana (Bremer, 1865)
- Ptycholoma virescana (Clemens, 1865)

== Distribution ==
Species in this genus are present in most of Europe, in the eastern Palearctic realm, and in the Near East.
