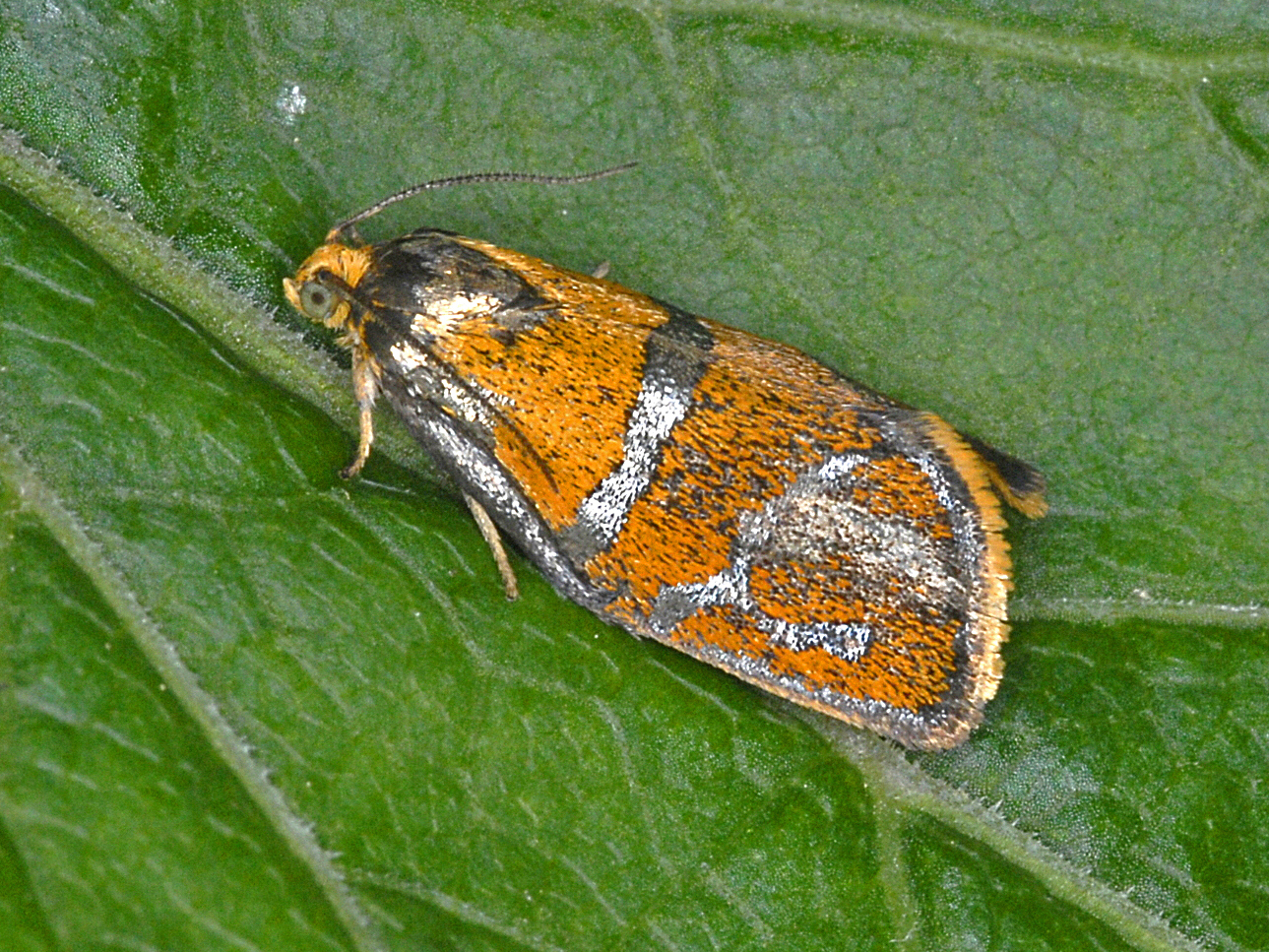
- Adult

Scientific classification
- Kingdom: Animalia
- Phylum: Arthropoda
- Class: Insecta
- Order: Lepidoptera
- Family: Tortricidae
- Genus: Ptycholoma
- Species: P. lecheana

Binomial name
- Ptycholoma lecheana (Linnaeus, 1758)

Synonyms
- List: Phalaena (Tortrix) lecheana Linnaeus, 1758; Tortrix circumclusana Christoph, 1881; Ptycholoma circumclusna Choi et al., 2004; Cacoecia magnificana Herrich-Schäffer, 1861; Cacoecia lecheana nipponica Oka, 1925; Orthotaenia obsoletana Stephens, 1829; Ptycholoma obsoletana Stephens, 1834

= Ptycholoma lecheana =

Species of moth

Ptycholoma lecheana, the Leche's twist moth, is a moth of the family Tortricidae. It is found in Europe, China (Heilongjiang, Jilin, Hunan), Korea, Japan, Russia (Amur, Ussuri) and Asia Minor.

The wingspan is 16–20 mm. The forewings have the termen nearly straight, rather oblique, and a strong costal fold from the base to the middle. The ground colour is dark fuscous, more or less densely irrorated or suffused with ferruginous-ochreous. The edges of the central fascia and the apex of the costal patch are more or less defined by leaden -metallic lines. The hindwings are blackish-grey. The larva is light green, above blackish-green; spots pale; head light brown.

The moth flies from late May to early June in China and to July in western Europe.

The larvae feed on various trees and shrubs, including Acer, Betula, Crataegus pinnatifida, Fagus, Larix leptolepis, Populus, Prunus padus, Pyrus, Quercus, Salix koreensis, Sorbus, Tilia and Ulmus species.
