= Ptycholoma imitator =

Scientific classification
- Domain: Eukaryota
- Kingdom: Animalia
- Phylum: Arthropoda
- Class: Insecta
- Order: Lepidoptera
- Family: Tortricidae
- Genus: Ptycholoma
- Species: P. imitator

Binomial name
- Ptycholoma imitator (Walsingham, 1900)

Synonyms
- Archips imitator Walsingham, 1900

Species of moth

Ptycholoma imitator is a species of moth of the family Tortricidae. It is found in China (Heilongjiang, Jilin, Fujian), the Korean Peninsula, Japan (Hokkaido, Honshu) and Russia (Amur, Siberia). The habitat consists of oak forests, cedar broad-leaved forests, fir broad-leaved forests, valley broad-leaved forests and gardens.

The wingspan is 18–24 for males and 24 mm for females. Adults are on wing from July to August.
