= Eleutherococcus brachypus =

Conservation status
- Endangered (IUCN 3.1)

Scientific classification
- Kingdom: Plantae
- Clade: Tracheophytes
- Clade: Angiosperms
- Clade: Eudicots
- Clade: Asterids
- Order: Apiales
- Family: Araliaceae
- Genus: Eleutherococcus
- Species: E. brachypus

Binomial name
- Eleutherococcus brachypus (Harms) Nakai, Fl. Sylv. Kor. 16: 27. 1927

Synonyms
- Acanthopanax brachypus

Species of flowering plant

Eleutherococcus brachypus (Chinese: 短柄五加 duan bing wu jia) is a species of flowering plant in the family Araliaceae. It is endemic to China, where it occurs in scrub fields and roadsides on mountain slopes in Gansu, Ningxia, and Shaanxi provinces.

This plant contains acetylated stilbenoid glucosides.
