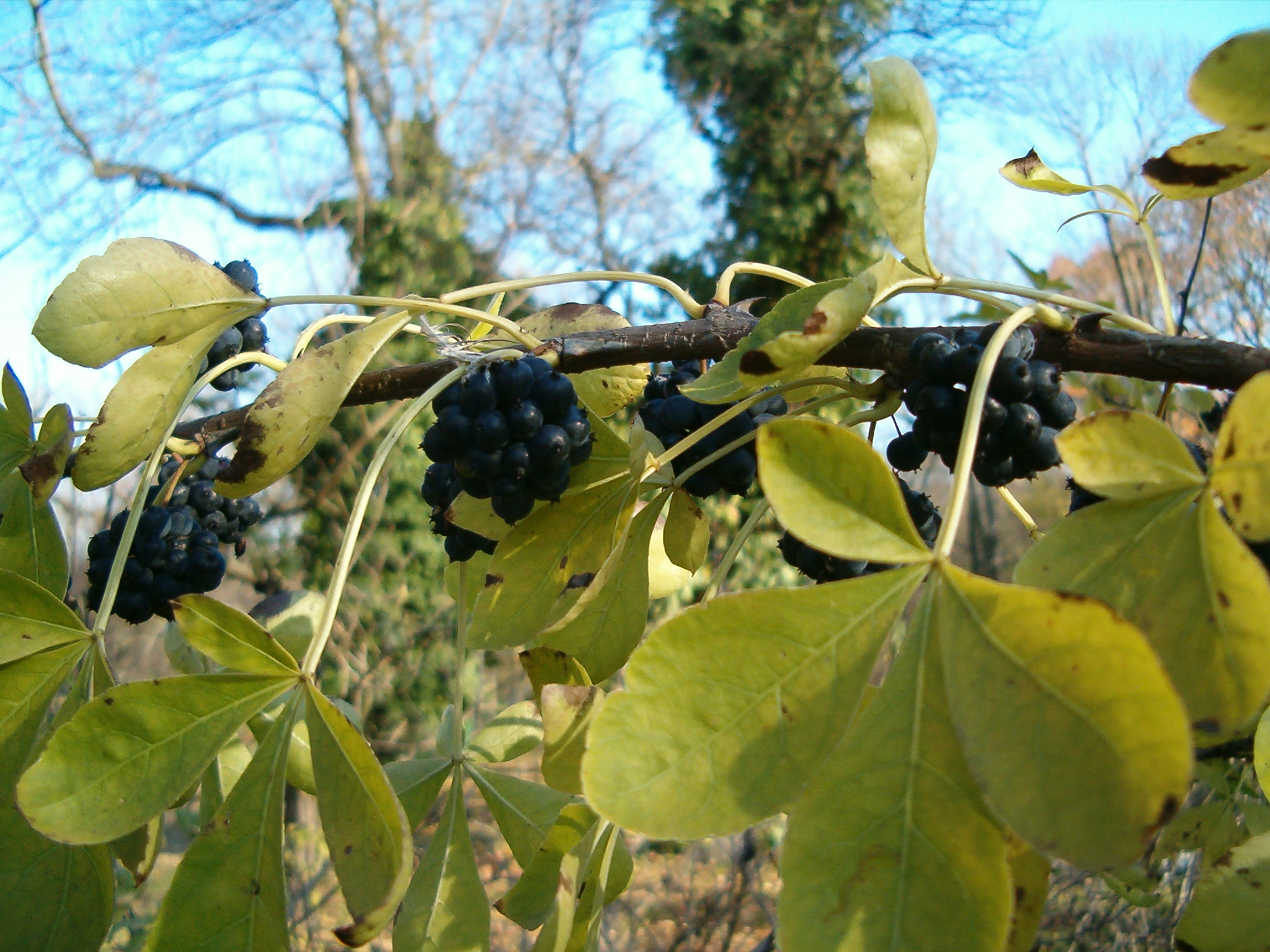
- Eleutherococcus gracilistylus

Scientific classification
- Kingdom: Plantae
- Clade: Tracheophytes
- Clade: Angiosperms
- Clade: Eudicots
- Clade: Asterids
- Order: Apiales
- Family: Araliaceae
- Subfamily: Aralioideae
- Genus: Eleutherococcus; Maxim.

Species
- See text

Synonyms
- Acanthopanax (Decne. & Planch.) Miq.

= Eleutherococcus =

Genus of flowering plants

Eleutherococcus is a genus of 38 species of thorny shrubs and trees in the family Araliaceae. They are native to eastern Asia, from southeast Siberia and Japan to the Philippines and Vietnam. 18 species come from China, from central to western parts.

Perhaps the best known in the West is the species E. senticosus used as herbal medicine, and commonly known by such English names as Eleuthero or Siberian ginseng. In Traditional Chinese medicine, this is administered to increase energy, thus traditionally recognized to have attributes akin to true ginseng (Panax). This is also reflected in its formerly used genus name Acanthopanax meaning "thorny ginseng". The word "Eleutherococcus," from Greek, means "free-berried."

The European Medicines Agency has concluded that there is insufficient evidence to demonstrate the efficacy of Eleutherococcus for any clinical condition.

== Naming ==
The Chinese materia medica in question (Chinese: 五加皮; pinyin: wǔjiāpí; Wade–Giles: wuchiapi) may designate a number of species. But the plant now given the common name wujia in China is specifically E. gracilistylus, and according to one source, the genuine crude drug must come from this species, and C. spinosum is only a substitute.

The Japanese name ukogi (ウコギ, 五加(木)) borrows directly from the Chinese name, and refers somewhat broadly to several plants in the genus. A 10th century herbology text, Honzō wamyō (本草和名), introduced the Chinese wujia as an herb to be pronounced mu-ko-gi (牟古岐), refers specifically to E. sieboldianus (Japanese name: hime-ukogi). (See #Species list below).

The taxonomical nomenclature in the botanical science also has had a sinuous history, so that Acanthopanax had been used as the proper genus name in China till recent years, while the West adopted Eleutherococcus as the official name.

== Cultivation ==
Several species are also grown as ornamental garden shrubs. In Japan, they have been planted as hedges. Particularly in Yamagata Prefecture, a daimyō named Uesugi Yōzan encouraged the planting of the ukogi as fencing around the homes of samurai retainers (E. sieboldianus was planted in the region), and the bitter young buds, leaves and stems have traditionally been picked and eaten as vegetable in the area. However, since the plant is deciduous, it requires sweeping in the fall (high maintenance), and the bare hedges fail to protect the homeowner's privacy.

== Fossil record ==
The four earliest fossil species of Eleutherococcus are from the Maastrichtian (about 70 Ma) floras of Eisleben and Walbeck, Germany, the synonym Acanthopanax is used for these species †A. friedrichii, †A. gigantocarpus, †A. mansfeldensis and †A. obliquocostatus.

== Species ==
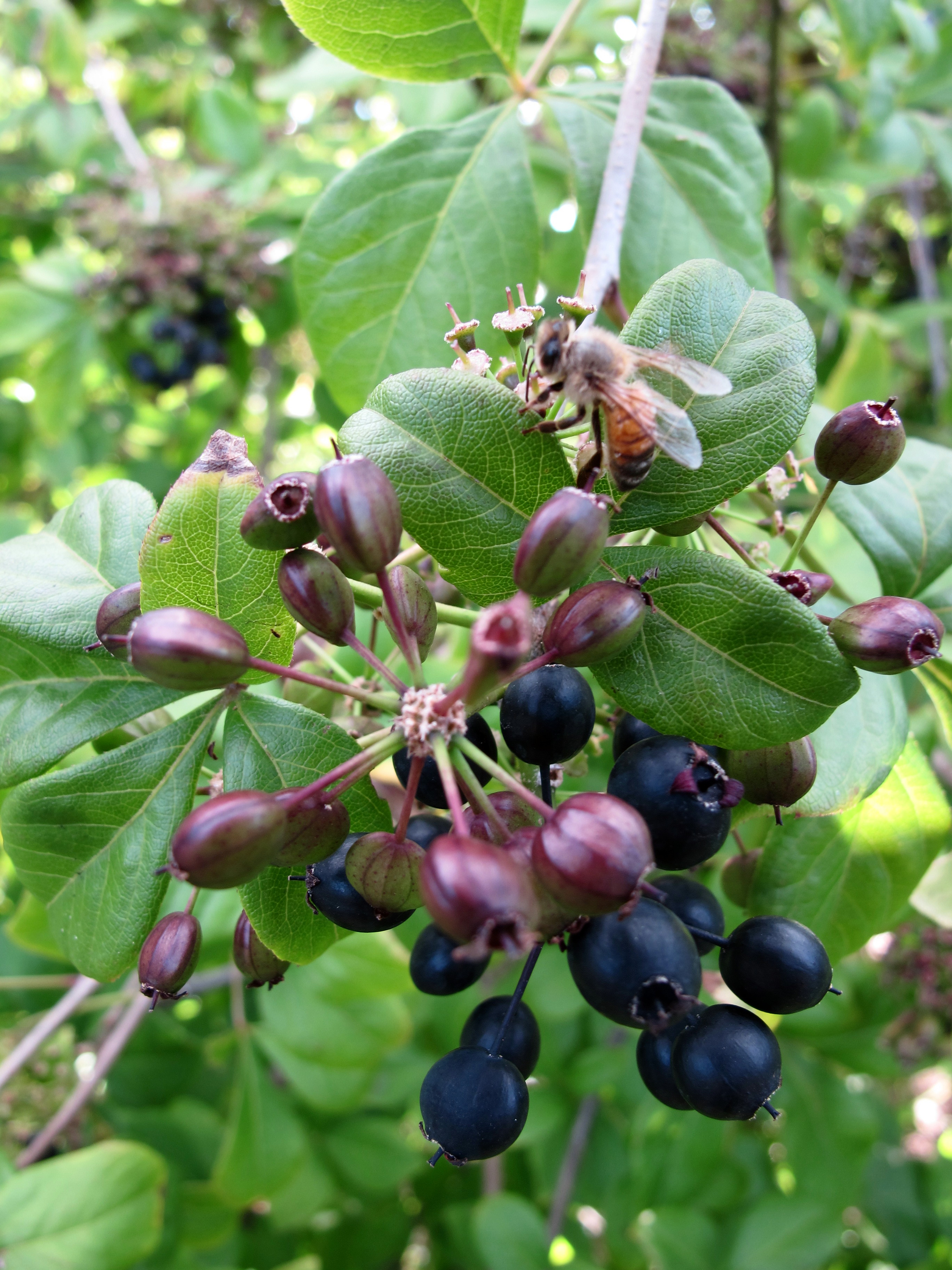
Eleutherococcus trifoliatus

- Eleutherococcus baoxinensis
- Eleutherococcus brachypus
- Eleutherococcus cissifolius
- Eleutherococcus cuspidatus
- Eleutherococcus divaricatus, Ja:keyama-ukogi (ケヤマウコギ), aka oni-ukogi. Found in central and southern Japan, Korean peninsula, China, with many flowers arranged in conical inflorescence
- Eleutherococcus eleutheristylus
- Eleutherococcus giraldii
- Eleutherococcus gracilistylus
- Eleutherococcus henryi
- Eleutherococcus higoensis, Ja:higo-ukogi (ヒゴウコギ)
- Eleutherococcus huangshanensis
- Eleutherococcus hypoleucus, Ja:urajiro-ukogi (ウラジロウコギ), growing in limestone soils in Honshu, Shikoku, Kyushu
- Eleutherococcus japonicus, Ja:oka-ukogi (オカウコギ, "land~"), aka tsukushi-ukogi, maruba-ukogi. Grows in hilly terrain, of Kanto, Tokai, Kii Peninsula.
- Eleutherococcus lasiogyne
- Eleutherococcus leucorrhizus
- Eleutherococcus nanpingensis
- Eleutherococcus nikaianus, Ja:urage-ukogi (ウラゲウコギ), variety found in Honshu, Shikoku, Kyushu with yellow-green flowers and blackish-purple fruits.
- Eleutherococcus nodiflorus
- Eleutherococcus pilosulus
- Eleutherococcus pseudosetulosus
- Eleutherococcus pubescens
- Eleutherococcus rehderianus
- Eleutherococcus rufinervis
- Eleutherococcus scandens
- Eleutherococcus senticosus (Rupr. & Maxim.) Maxim., ezo-ukogi (エゾウコギ), species found in Hokkaido, with many white flowers in globular clusters;
- Eleutherococcus seoulensis
- Eleutherococcus sessiliflorus
- Eleutherococcus setchuensis
- Eleutherococcus setulosus
- Eleutherococcus sieboldianus (Makino) Koidz., Ja:hime-ukogi (ヒメウコギ), native to China's mainland.
- Eleutherococcus simonii
- Eleutherococcus spinosus (L. f.) S.Y. Hu, Ja:yama-ukogi (ヤマウコギ), growing widely in Honshu and Shikoku, with white flowers in globular inflorescence
- Eleutherococcus stenophyllus
- Eleutherococcus trichodon, Ja:miyama-ukogi (ミヤマウコギ), found widely in Honshu and Shikoku
- Eleutherococcus trifoliatus (L. f.) S.Y. Hu
- Eleutherococcus verticillatus
- Eleutherococcus wardii
- Eleutherococcus wilsonii
- Eleutherococcus xizangensis

=== Formerly under Acanthopanax ===
- Various Eleutherococcus spp.
- Acanthopanax ricinifolium → Kalopanax septemlobus Harigiri (ハリギリ, 刺楸)
- Eleutherococcus sciadophylloides, koshiabura (コシアブラ) → Chengiopanax sciadophylloides
