= Ludovic Savatier =

French naval doctor and botanist (1830–1891)

Paul Amedée Ludovic Savatier (19 October 1830 – 27 August 1891) was a French naval doctor and botanist.

Savatier was born on the Atlantic island of Oléron, off La Rochelle and Rochefort, in 1830. He studied medicine at the Naval Medical School of Rochefort. He subsequently became a high-ranking medical officer in the French Navy.

In 1865, as part of a French effort to support the construction of a Japanese Navy, he travelled to Japan, and spent the next decade there, based at Yokosuka. During his tenure there he devoted himself primarily to botany, attempting to impart the Linnean model to Japanese botanical classifications. He collaborated with a large number of other botanists and researchers, including Japanese botanists Keisuke Ito and Yoshio Tanaka, and Frederick Victor Dickins, a fellow naval medical officer (in the British Navy). This work eventually resulted in a joint publication with his colleague Adrien René Franchet, entitled Enumeratio Plantenum in Japonia Sponte Crescentium, which was published in Paris in 1875 (vol. 1) and 1879 (vol. 2). Savatier also translated existing texts on Japanese botany, including works by Ono Ranzan. In his capacity as a medical officer, he was also responsible for a systematic study of venereal disease among the French sailors and prostitutes of the port.

In 1876 Savatier returned to France. Shortly thereafter he was assigned to a naval expedition headed for the Pacific. During this voyage, he made excursions in both South and North America, exploring Patagonia and Tierra del Fuego in 1877. As part of this voyage he made a detailed botanical study of the flora of Tahiti. He published an article about his voyage, which was made in part on the ship La Magicienne. Many items collected or produced during this expedition are stored or displayed at the National Museum of Natural History, France in Paris.

Ludovic Savatier, as 'Médecin général de la Marine' (General Doctor of the Navy), was awarded the Legion of Honour ('Légion d'Honneur') by the French government in 1880.

The standard author abbreviation Sav. is used to indicate this person as the author when citing a botanical name.

Savatier died at Saint-Georges-d'Oléron in 1891.
