= M. ferruginea =

M. ferruginea may refer to:

- Malthonica ferruginea, a spider species found in Europe
- Mapania ferruginea a plant species found in Cameroon and São Tomé and Príncipe
- Menziesia ferruginea, the rusty menziesia, a flowering plant species
- Muscicapa ferruginea, the ferruginous flycatcher, a bird species found in Bangladesh and Bhutan
- Myrmeciza ferruginea, the ferruginous-backed antbird, a species of bird found in Brazil and French Guiana

== Synonyms ==
- Macalla ferruginea, a synonym for Salma pyrastis, a moth species found in the south eastern quarter of Australia
- Mesua ferruginea, a synonym for Kayea ferruginea, a plant species

== See also ==
- Ferruginea (disambiguation)
