= Cyperus pseudothyrsiflorus =

Scientific classification
- Kingdom: Plantae
- Clade: Tracheophytes
- Clade: Angiosperms
- Clade: Monocots
- Clade: Commelinids
- Order: Poales
- Family: Cyperaceae
- Genus: Cyperus
- Species: C. pseudothyrsiflorus

Binomial name
- Cyperus pseudothyrsiflorus (Kük.) J. Rich. Carter & S.D. Jones

Synonyms
- Cyperus uniflorus var. pseudothyrsiflorus Kük.

Species of plant

Cyperus pseudothyrsiflorus is a plant species native to Nuevo León, New Mexico and Texas, It occurs in cultivated fields and other disturbed areas at elevations of less than 1000 m (3400 feet).

Cyperus pseudothyrsiflorus is a perennial herb spreading by underground rhizomes. Stems are triangular in cross-section, up to 40 cm (16 inches) tall.

It is a member of Cyperus, subgenus Cyperus, section Umbellati. It was first formally described as a new variety of C. uniflorus by Georg Kükenthal in 1937, but was promoted to an independent species in 1997. It is very similar to C. uniflorus, which is now known as C. retroflexus.

== See also ==
- List of Cyperus species
