= Cyperus steadii =

Scientific classification
- Kingdom: Plantae
- Clade: Tracheophytes
- Clade: Angiosperms
- Clade: Monocots
- Clade: Commelinids
- Order: Poales
- Family: Cyperaceae
- Genus: Cyperus
- Species: C. steadii

Binomial name
- Cyperus steadii Kük

Species of plant endemic to Iran and Pakistan

Cyperus steadii is a species of sedge that is endemic to parts of Iran and Pakistan.

The species was first formally described by the botanist Georg Kükenthal in 1931.

== See also ==
- List of Cyperus species
