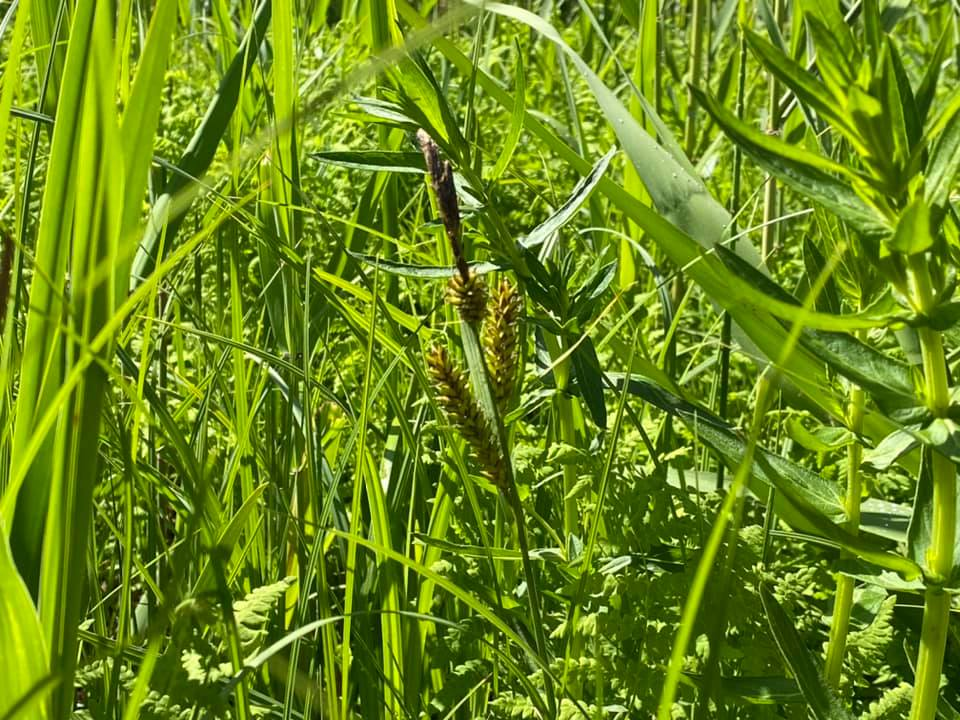

Scientific classification
- Kingdom: Plantae
- Clade: Tracheophytes
- Clade: Angiosperms
- Clade: Monocots
- Clade: Commelinids
- Order: Poales
- Family: Cyperaceae
- Genus: Carex
- Species: C. rugulosa

Binomial name
- Carex rugulosa Kük.

= Carex rugulosa =

Species of sedge

Carex rugulosa, also known as the thick-nerve sedge or the slender-culm thick-nerve sedge, is a tussock-forming perennial in the family Cyperaceae. It is native to the eastern parts of Asia.

== Description ==
The rhizomous sedge has a prostrate stem, known as a stolon that runs along or slightly below the surface of the ground. It is able to produce new plants from buds found at the tip or nodes. The stems, or culms, of the sedge are typically 50 to 80 cm (20 to 31 in) in length with a triangular cross-section. The culms are smooth toward the bottom and become rougher toward the top. The base is often surrounded by red-brown coloured sheaths that deteriorate into a fibrous mass over time. The leaves are almost as long as the culms and have flat, stiff and sheathed leaf-blades that are 3 to 5 mm (0.12 to 0.20 in) wide. There are clusters of leafy bracts beneath in inflorescences. The inflorescences consist of four to six spikes that have a narrowly lanceolate shape and are 1 to 3.5 cm (0.39 to 1.38 in) in length.

== Taxonomy ==
The species was first described by the botanist Georg Kükenthal in 1903. It has one synonym, Carex smirnovii

== Distribution ==
The range of the plant extends from Tuva in Russia in the north west down to the northern part of Central China in the south west, through the Korean Peninsula to Japan in the east. It can grow in along the lower reaches of rivers and in brackish marshes forming dense stands.

== See also ==
- List of Carex species
