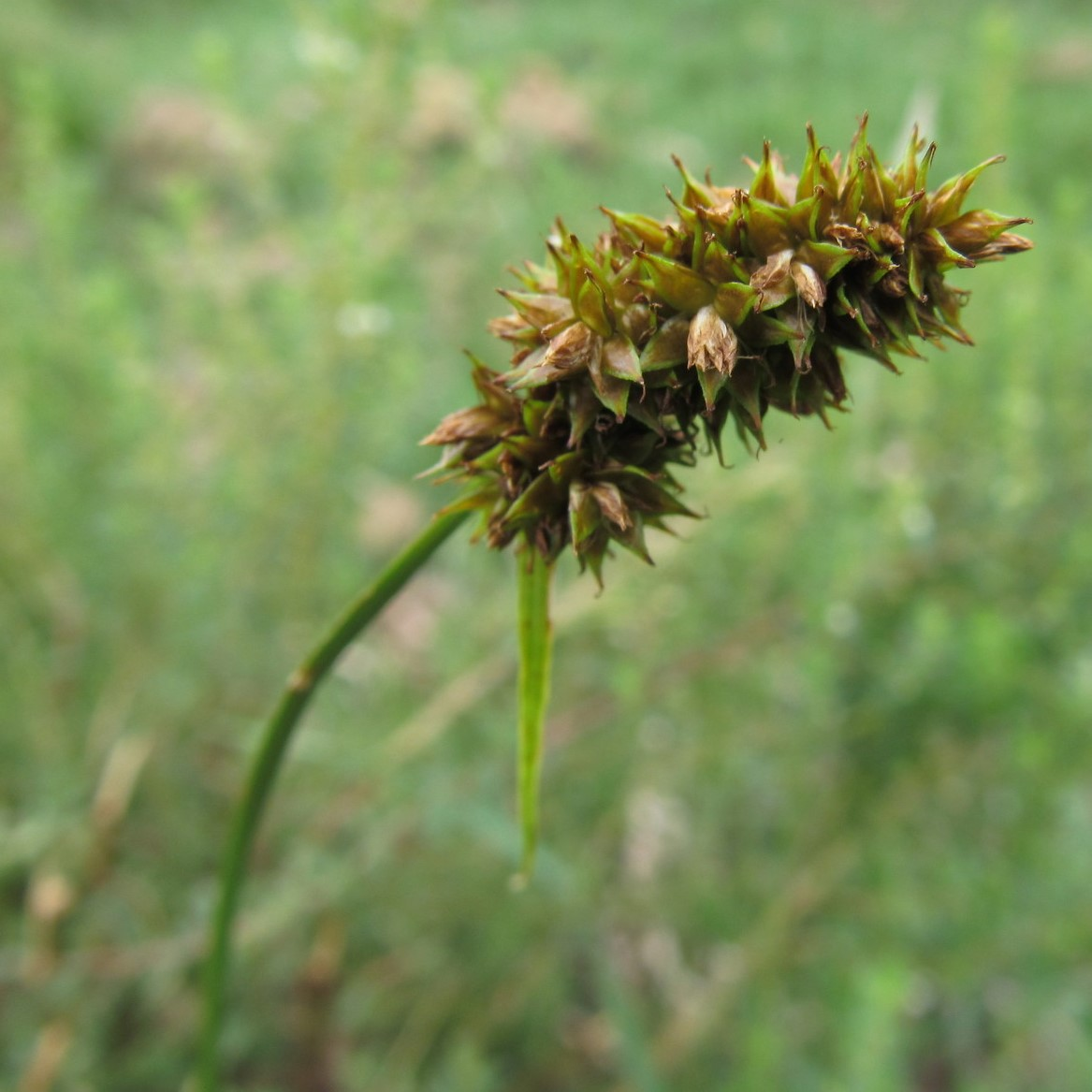

Scientific classification
- Kingdom: Plantae
- Clade: Tracheophytes
- Clade: Angiosperms
- Clade: Monocots
- Clade: Commelinids
- Order: Poales
- Family: Cyperaceae
- Genus: Carex
- Species: C. subdivulsa

Binomial name
- Carex subdivulsa (Kük) G.A.Wheeler (2002)

Synonyms
- Carex involucrata var. subdivulsa Kük. (1899); Carex sororia f. subdivulsa (Kük.) Kük. (1909)

= Carex subdivulsa =

Species of plant

Carex subdivulsa is a tussock-forming species of perennial sedge in the family Cyperaceae. It is native to north-western Argentina.

== See also ==
- List of Carex species
