= Carex reichei =

Scientific classification
- Kingdom: Plantae
- Clade: Tracheophytes
- Clade: Angiosperms
- Clade: Monocots
- Clade: Commelinids
- Order: Poales
- Family: Cyperaceae
- Genus: Carex
- Species: C. reichei

Binomial name
- Carex reichei Kük., 1899

Synonyms
- Carex aueri Kalela

Species of sedge

Carex reichei is a species of tussock-forming perennial in the family Cyperaceae. It is native to south-western parts of South America.

== See also ==
- List of Carex species
