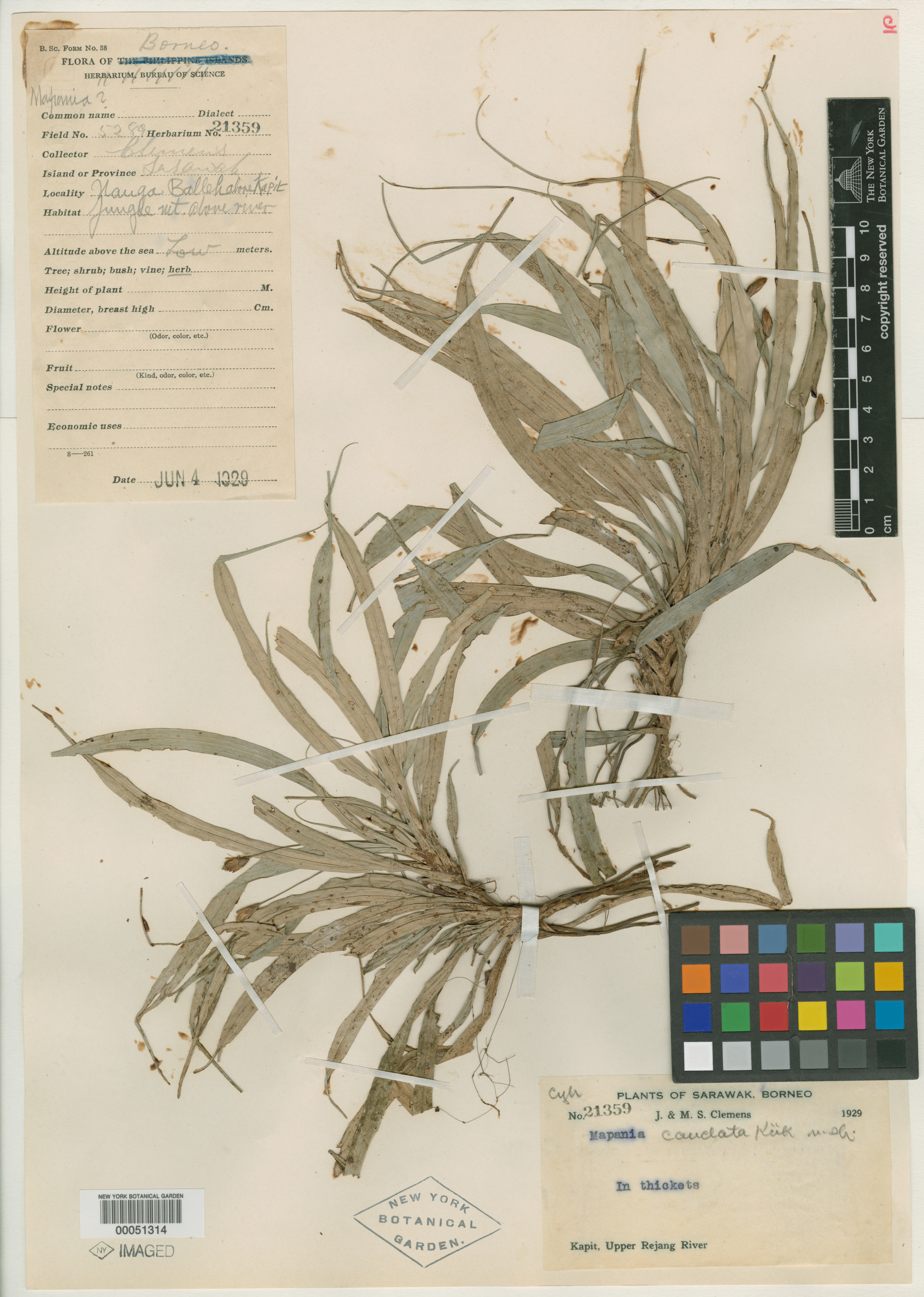

Scientific classification
- Kingdom: Plantae
- Clade: Tracheophytes
- Clade: Angiosperms
- Clade: Monocots
- Clade: Commelinids
- Order: Poales
- Family: Cyperaceae
- Genus: Mapania
- Species: M. caudata

Binomial name
- Mapania caudata Kük.

Synonyms
- Mapania petiolata var. pumila Uittien; Mapania cuspidata var. pumila (Uittien) Uittien

= Mapania caudata =

Species of grass-like plant

Mapania caudata is a species of plant in the sedge family, Cyperaceae. It is found throughout the Peninsular Malaysia, but particularly on the east side. Its natural habitat is shady, moist microclimates in tropical understory. Like several other shady understory plant species, its leaves display blue iridescence. The mechanism was described as resulting from silica nanoparticles in microfibrillar layers stacked into helicoidal structures, appearing on the adaxial epidermal surface, with the iridescence from cell surfaces being left-circularly polarized.
