= Cyperus longistylus =

Scientific classification
- Kingdom: Plantae
- Clade: Tracheophytes
- Clade: Angiosperms
- Clade: Monocots
- Clade: Commelinids
- Order: Poales
- Family: Cyperaceae
- Genus: Cyperus
- Species: C. longistylus

Binomial name
- Cyperus longistylus Kük.

Species of plant endemic to the Solomon Islands

Cyperus longistylus is a species of sedge that is endemic to the Solomon Islands.

The species was first formally described by the botanist Georg Kükenthal in 1929.

== See also ==
- List of Cyperus species
