= Cyperus sartorii =

Scientific classification
- Kingdom: Plantae
- Clade: Embryophytes
- Clade: Tracheophytes
- Clade: Spermatophytes
- Clade: Angiosperms
- Clade: Monocots
- Clade: Commelinids
- Order: Poales
- Family: Cyperaceae
- Genus: Cyperus
- Species: C. sartorii

Binomial name
- Cyperus sartorii Kük.

Species of plant native to South Africa

Cyperus sartorii is a species of sedge that is endemic to the Cape Provinces of South Africa.

The species was first formally described by the botanist Georg Kükenthal in 1936.

== See also ==
- List of Cyperus species
