= Cyperus chlorocephalus =

Scientific classification
- Kingdom: Plantae
- Clade: Tracheophytes
- Clade: Angiosperms
- Clade: Monocots
- Clade: Commelinids
- Order: Poales
- Family: Cyperaceae
- Genus: Cyperus
- Species: C. chlorocephalus

Binomial name
- Cyperus chlorocephalus (C.B.Clarke) Kük.

Species of sedge

Cyperus chlorocephalus is a species of sedge that is native to parts of Central America and northern parts of South America.

== See also ==
- List of Cyperus species
