= Carex haematosaccus =

Scientific classification
- Kingdom: Plantae
- Clade: Tracheophytes
- Clade: Angiosperms
- Clade: Monocots
- Clade: Commelinids
- Order: Poales
- Family: Cyperaceae
- Genus: Carex
- Species: C. haematosaccus

Binomial name
- Carex haematosaccus C.B.Clarke

Synonyms
- Carex euryphylla Cherm.; Carex renschiana var. brachystachya Cherm.

Species of sedge

Carex haematosaccus is a tussock-forming species of perennial sedge in the family Cyperaceae. It is native to central and eastern parts of Madagascar.

== See also ==
- List of Carex species
