= Cyperus kilimandscharicus =

Scientific classification
- Kingdom: Plantae
- Clade: Tracheophytes
- Clade: Angiosperms
- Clade: Monocots
- Clade: Commelinids
- Order: Poales
- Family: Cyperaceae
- Genus: Cyperus
- Species: C. kilimandscharicus

Binomial name
- Cyperus kilimandscharicus Kük.

Species of plant native to eastern Africa

Cyperus kilimandscharicus is a species of sedge that is native to an area of eastern Africa.

The species was first formally described by the botanist Georg Kükenthal in 1925.

== See also ==
- List of Cyperus species
