= Carex vesca =

Scientific classification
- Kingdom: Plantae
- Clade: Tracheophytes
- Clade: Angiosperms
- Clade: Monocots
- Clade: Commelinids
- Order: Poales
- Family: Cyperaceae
- Genus: Carex
- Species: C. vesca

Binomial name
- Carex vesca C.B.Clarke ex. Kük., 1906

Species of sedge

Carex vesca is a tussock-forming perennial in the family Cyperaceae. It is native to south eastern parts of the Brazil.

== See also ==
- List of Carex species
