= Carex sodiroi =

Conservation status
- Data Deficient (IUCN 3.1)

Scientific classification
- Kingdom: Plantae
- Clade: Tracheophytes
- Clade: Angiosperms
- Clade: Monocots
- Clade: Commelinids
- Order: Poales
- Family: Cyperaceae
- Genus: Carex
- Species: C. sodiroi

Binomial name
- Carex sodiroi Kük.

Species of grass-like plant

Carex sodiroi is a species of sedge native to Ecuador and Venezuela. It known from a single collection made by Luis Sodiro at some time before 1886. It was found around 4 kilometres (2.5 mi) from Nanegalito, and described as a new species by the sedge expert Georg Kükenthal in 1904. The holotype was deposited in the Berlin herbarium, where it may have been destroyed in the Second World War; if there are no isotypes in Ecuador, then the only record of the species may be a photograph in the Field Museum in Chicago.
