= Cyperus meeboldii =

Scientific classification
- Kingdom: Plantae
- Clade: Tracheophytes
- Clade: Angiosperms
- Clade: Monocots
- Clade: Commelinids
- Order: Poales
- Family: Cyperaceae
- Genus: Cyperus
- Species: C. meeboldii

Binomial name
- Cyperus meeboldii Kük.

Species of plant native to Africa and India

Cyperus meeboldii is a species of sedge that is found across India and parts of central and eastern Africa.

The species was first formally described by the botanist Georg Kükenthal in 1922.

== See also ==
- List of Cyperus species
