= Cyperus cornelii-ostenii =

Scientific classification
- Kingdom: Plantae
- Clade: Tracheophytes
- Clade: Angiosperms
- Clade: Monocots
- Clade: Commelinids
- Order: Poales
- Family: Cyperaceae
- Genus: Cyperus
- Species: C. cornelii-ostenii

Binomial name
- Cyperus cornelii-ostenii Kük

Species of plant native to South America

Cyperus cornelii-ostenii is a species of sedge that is native to an area of South America.

The species was first formally described by the botanist Georg Kükenthal in 1931.

== See also ==
- List of Cyperus species
