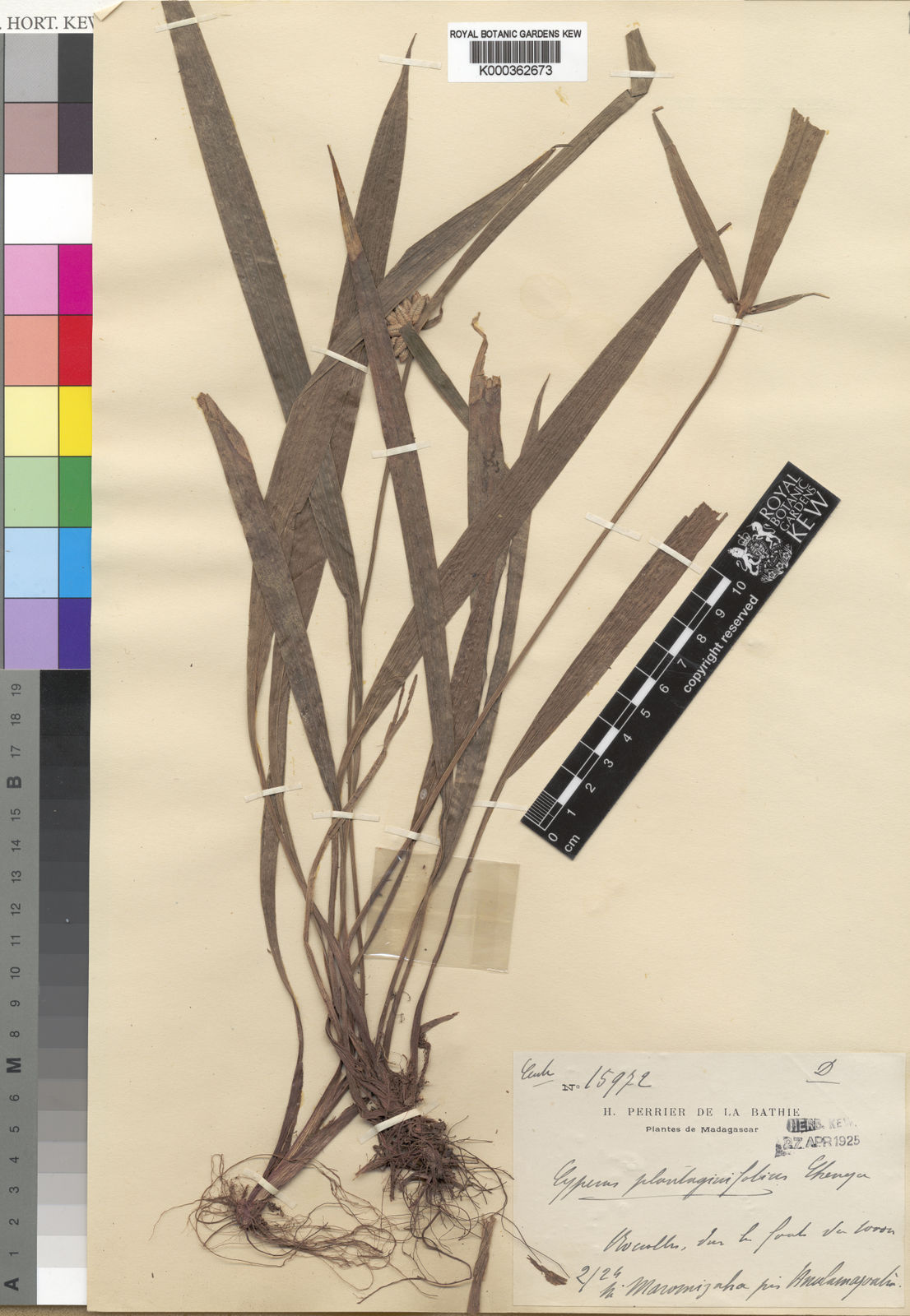
- Herbarium specimen

Scientific classification
- Kingdom: Plantae
- Clade: Embryophytes
- Clade: Tracheophytes
- Clade: Angiosperms
- Clade: Monocots
- Clade: Commelinids
- Order: Poales
- Family: Cyperaceae
- Genus: Cyperus
- Species: C. plantaginifolius

Binomial name
- Cyperus plantaginifolius Cherm.

Synonyms
- Cyperus plantaginifolius var. minor

= Cyperus plantaginifolius =

Plant species in the sedge family

Cyperus plantaginifolius is a species of sedge that is endemic to Madagascar.

== Description ==
Cyperus plantaginifolius is a herbaceous plant, one lacking woody parts, that grows perennially. It has stiff clums, the stems specific to sedges, with three sides and a smooth surface. They range in size from 15 to 45 centimeters (6 to 18 in) with a width of 1.4 to 2 millimeters. They have rhizomes and short stolons.

The plant's leaves are 10 to 25 cm (3.9 to 9.8 in) long with a width of 15 mm. They are very narrowly lanceolate, shaped like the head of a spear with the widest part below the midpoint of the leaf. They are rough on both the top and underside with edges that fold towards their bases. They are green and transition to purplish-red towards their attachment.

The flowering head is densely packed and has multiple spikelets.

== Taxonomy ==
The species was first formally described by the botanist Henri Chermezon in 1920. He placed the species in the genus Cyperus within the family Cyperaceae. In 1925 he also described a variety of the species that he named minor. However, this is not an accepted subdivision according to Plants of the World Online.

== Range and habitat ==
Cyperus plantaginifolius has a limited range. It is endemic to the mountain forests of the central parts of eastern Madagascar. Most often it grow on humid massifs at moderate elevations of 500 to 1,500 meters (1,600 to 4,900 ft). It is similar to relatives that also grow in rainforests, it lives in shaded leaf litter of the forests as part of the understory.

== See also ==
- List of Cyperus species
