= Carex ecuadorica =

Scientific classification
- Kingdom: Plantae
- Clade: Tracheophytes
- Clade: Angiosperms
- Clade: Monocots
- Clade: Commelinids
- Order: Poales
- Family: Cyperaceae
- Genus: Carex
- Species: C. ecuadorica

Binomial name
- Carex ecuadorica Kük., 1904

Species of sedge

Carex ecuadorica is a tussock-forming perennial in the family Cyperaceae. It is native to parts of South America.

== See also ==
- List of Carex species
