= Cyperus phillipsiae =

Scientific classification
- Kingdom: Plantae
- Clade: Tracheophytes
- Clade: Angiosperms
- Clade: Monocots
- Clade: Commelinids
- Order: Poales
- Family: Cyperaceae
- Genus: Cyperus
- Species: C. phillipsiae

Binomial name
- Cyperus phillipsiae (C.B.Clarke) Kük. 1936

Species of sedge

Cyperus phillipsiae is a species of sedge that is native to eastern parts of Africa.

== See also ==
- List of Cyperus species
