= Carex biegensis =

Scientific classification
- Kingdom: Plantae
- Clade: Tracheophytes
- Clade: Angiosperms
- Clade: Monocots
- Clade: Commelinids
- Order: Poales
- Family: Cyperaceae
- Genus: Carex
- Species: C. biegensis

Binomial name
- Carex biegensis Cherm.

Species of plant

Carex biegensis is a tussock-forming species of perennial sedge in the family Cyperaceae. It is native to central parts of Africa, including Rwanda, Tanzania, Uganda and the Democratic Republic of the Congo.

== See also ==
- List of Carex species
