= Carex aequialta =

Scientific classification
- Kingdom: Plantae
- Clade: Tracheophytes
- Clade: Angiosperms
- Clade: Monocots
- Clade: Commelinids
- Order: Poales
- Family: Cyperaceae
- Genus: Carex
- Species: C. aequialta

Binomial name
- Carex aequialta Kük., 1909

Species of sedge

Carex aequialta is a tussock-forming perennial in the family Cyperaceae, that is native to China, Japan and Korea. Its common name in Korean is 물꼬리사초 or Mul-kko-ri-sa-cho.

== Description ==
The perennial herb typically grows to a height of 42 to 60 cm (17 to 24 in) and has short rhizomes and trigonous shaped culms with a length of 26 to 50 cm (10 to 20 in). The basal leaves are brown and scalelike. There are also cauline leaves. The inflorescence is corymb-like with 2 to 4 spikes. The terminal spikes are 1.5 to 4.5 centimeters long, and awnless. There are 2 to 3 lateral spikes which are between 1.5 and 5 long. The perigynia are obovate, wide, and smooth. The achenes are suborbicular are 2 to 2.5 millimeters long.

== See also ==
- List of Carex species
