= Cyperus rufostriatus =

Scientific classification
- Kingdom: Plantae
- Clade: Tracheophytes
- Clade: Angiosperms
- Clade: Monocots
- Clade: Commelinids
- Order: Poales
- Family: Cyperaceae
- Genus: Cyperus
- Species: C. rufostriatus

Binomial name
- Cyperus rufostriatus C.B.Clarke ex Cherm., 1919

Species of sedge

Cyperus rufostriatus is a species of sedge that is native to eastern parts of the Madagascar.

== See also ==
- List of Cyperus species
