= Carex montis-everestii =

Conservation status
- Least Concern (IUCN 3.1)

Scientific classification
- Kingdom: Plantae
- Clade: Tracheophytes
- Clade: Angiosperms
- Clade: Monocots
- Clade: Commelinids
- Order: Poales
- Family: Cyperaceae
- Genus: Carex
- Species: C. montis-everestii

Binomial name
- Carex montis-everestii Kük., 1934

Species of sedge

Carex montis-everestii is a tussock-forming perennial in the family Cyperaceae. It is native to parts of the Himalayas.

== See also ==
- List of Carex species
