= Carex bucharica =

Scientific classification
- Kingdom: Plantae
- Clade: Tracheophytes
- Clade: Angiosperms
- Clade: Monocots
- Clade: Commelinids
- Order: Poales
- Family: Cyperaceae
- Genus: Carex
- Species: C. bucharica

Binomial name
- Carex bucharica Kük., 1920

Species of sedge

Carex bucharica is a tussock-forming perennial in the family Cyperaceae, that is native to central and western parts of parts of Asia.

== See also ==
- List of Carex species
