= Cyperus nduru =

Scientific classification
- Kingdom: Plantae
- Clade: Tracheophytes
- Clade: Angiosperms
- Clade: Monocots
- Clade: Commelinids
- Order: Poales
- Family: Cyperaceae
- Genus: Cyperus
- Species: C. nduru

Binomial name
- Cyperus nduru Cherm.

Species of plant native to Africa

Cyperus nduru is a species of sedge that is found across tropical Africa, including Central African Republic, Angola, Republic of Congo, Democratic Republic of Congo, Cameroon, Malawi, Mozambique, Ghana, Nigeria, Guinea, Tanzania, Zimbabwe and Sierra Leone.

The species was first formally described by the botanist Henri Chermezon in 1931.

== See also ==
- List of Cyperus species
