= Cyperus pilosulus =

Scientific classification
- Kingdom: Plantae
- Clade: Tracheophytes
- Clade: Angiosperms
- Clade: Monocots
- Clade: Commelinids
- Order: Poales
- Family: Cyperaceae
- Genus: Cyperus
- Species: C. pilosulus

Binomial name
- Cyperus pilosulus (C.B.Clarke) K.Schum. ex Kük., 1936

Species of sedge

Cyperus pilosulus is a species of sedge that is native to parts of Tanzania.

== See also ==
- List of Cyperus species
