= Cyperus guianensis =

Conservation status
- Least Concern (IUCN 3.1)

Scientific classification
- Kingdom: Plantae
- Clade: Tracheophytes
- Clade: Angiosperms
- Clade: Monocots
- Clade: Commelinids
- Order: Poales
- Family: Cyperaceae
- Genus: Cyperus
- Species: C. guianensis

Binomial name
- Cyperus guianensis (C.B.Clarke) Kük., 1936

Synonyms
- Mariscus guianensis C.B.Clarke

Species of sedge

Cyperus guianensis is a species of sedge that is native to northern parts of South America.

== See also ==
- List of Cyperus species
