= Cyperus chevalieri =

Scientific classification
- Kingdom: Plantae
- Clade: Tracheophytes
- Clade: Angiosperms
- Clade: Monocots
- Clade: Commelinids
- Order: Poales
- Family: Cyperaceae
- Genus: Cyperus
- Species: C. chevalieri

Binomial name
- Cyperus chevalieri Kük

Species of plant endemic to Africa

Cyperus chevalieri is a species of sedge that is endemic to Africa.

The species was first formally described by the botanist Georg Kükenthal in 1936.

== See also ==
- List of Cyperus species
