= Carex cubensis =

Scientific classification
- Kingdom: Plantae
- Clade: Tracheophytes
- Clade: Angiosperms
- Clade: Monocots
- Clade: Commelinids
- Order: Poales
- Family: Cyperaceae
- Genus: Carex
- Species: C. cubensis

Binomial name
- Carex cubensis Kük., 1926

Species of sedge

Carex cubensis is a tussock-forming perennial in the family Cyperaceae. It is native to parts of Cuba and Haiti.

== See also ==
- List of Carex species
