= Carex scabripes =

Scientific classification
- Kingdom: Plantae
- Clade: Tracheophytes
- Clade: Angiosperms
- Clade: Monocots
- Clade: Commelinids
- Order: Poales
- Family: Cyperaceae
- Genus: Carex
- Species: C. scabripes

Binomial name
- Carex scabripes Cherm.

Species of plant

Carex scabripes is a tussock-forming species of perennial sedge in the family Cyperaceae. It is native to parts of central Madagascar.

== See also ==
- List of Carex species
