= Cyperus laeteflorens =

Scientific classification
- Kingdom: Plantae
- Clade: Tracheophytes
- Clade: Angiosperms
- Clade: Monocots
- Clade: Commelinids
- Order: Poales
- Family: Cyperaceae
- Genus: Cyperus
- Species: C. laeteflorens

Binomial name
- Cyperus laeteflorens (C.B.Clarke) Kük. (1931)

Synonyms
- Mariscus laeteflorens C.B.Clarke (1908)

Species of sedge

Cyperus laeteflorens is a species of sedge that is endemic to New Caledonia.

== See also ==
- List of Cyperus species
