= Cyperus pallidicolor =

Scientific classification
- Kingdom: Plantae
- Clade: Tracheophytes
- Clade: Angiosperms
- Clade: Monocots
- Clade: Commelinids
- Order: Poales
- Family: Cyperaceae
- Genus: Cyperus
- Species: C. pallidicolor

Binomial name
- Cyperus pallidicolor (Kük.) G.C.Tucker 1993

Species of sedge

Cyperus pallidicolor, commonly known as the pallid flatsedge, is a species of sedge that is native to southern parts of North America, parts of Central America and northern parts of South America.

== See also ==
- List of Cyperus species
