= Cyperus albopilosus =

Scientific classification
- Kingdom: Plantae
- Clade: Tracheophytes
- Clade: Angiosperms
- Clade: Monocots
- Clade: Commelinids
- Order: Poales
- Family: Cyperaceae
- Genus: Cyperus
- Species: C. albopilosus

Binomial name
- Cyperus albopilosus (C.B.Clarke) Kük.

Species of plant native to Africa

Cyperus albopilosus is a species of sedge that is native to central Nigeria and southwest Ethiopia to Zimbabwe.

The species was first formally described by the botanist Georg Kükenthal in 1936 and was initially described as Mariscus albopilosus by Charles Baron Clarke.

== See also ==
- List of Cyperus species
