= Carex cinerascens =

Scientific classification
- Kingdom: Plantae
- Clade: Embryophytes
- Clade: Tracheophytes
- Clade: Spermatophytes
- Clade: Angiosperms
- Clade: Monocots
- Clade: Commelinids
- Order: Poales
- Family: Cyperaceae
- Genus: Carex
- Species: C. cinerascens

Binomial name
- Carex cinerascens Kük., 1902

Species of sedge

Carex cinerascens is a tussock-forming perennial in the family Cyperaceae, that is native to eastern parts of Asia. It is one of many species in the genus Carex.

== See also ==
- List of Carex species
