= Carex celebica =

Scientific classification
- Kingdom: Plantae
- Clade: Tracheophytes
- Clade: Angiosperms
- Clade: Monocots
- Clade: Commelinids
- Order: Poales
- Family: Cyperaceae
- Genus: Carex
- Species: C. celebica

Binomial name
- Carex celebica Kük., 1940

Species of sedge

Carex celebica is a tussock-forming perennial in the family Cyperaceae, that is native to parts of Malesia and Papua New Guinea.

== See also ==
- List of Carex species
