= Carex phragmitoides =

Conservation status
- Vulnerable (IUCN 3.1)

Scientific classification
- Kingdom: Plantae
- Clade: Tracheophytes
- Clade: Angiosperms
- Clade: Monocots
- Clade: Commelinids
- Order: Poales
- Family: Cyperaceae
- Genus: Carex
- Species: C. phragmitoides

Binomial name
- Carex phragmitoides Kük., 1925

Species of sedge

Carex phragmitoides is a tussock-forming perennial in the family Cyperaceae. It is native to eastern parts of Africa.

== See also ==
- List of Carex species
