= Cyperus subcaracasanus =

Scientific classification
- Kingdom: Plantae
- Clade: Tracheophytes
- Clade: Angiosperms
- Clade: Monocots
- Clade: Commelinids
- Order: Poales
- Family: Cyperaceae
- Genus: Cyperus
- Species: C. subcastaneus

Binomial name
- Cyperus subcastaneus Kük.

Species of plant endemic to Haiti

Cyperus subcaracasanus is a species of sedge that is endemic to Navassa Island, which lies off the coast of Haiti.

The species was first formally described by the botanist Georg Kükenthal in 1929.

== See also ==
- List of Cyperus species
