= Carex pyramidalis =

Scientific classification
- Kingdom: Plantae
- Clade: Tracheophytes
- Clade: Angiosperms
- Clade: Monocots
- Clade: Commelinids
- Order: Poales
- Family: Cyperaceae
- Genus: Carex
- Species: C. pyramidalis

Binomial name
- Carex pyramidalis Kük., 1903

Species of sedge

Carex pyramidalis is a tussock-forming perennial in the family Cyperaceae. It is native to parts of Madagascar and the Comoros Islands.

The only synonym is Carex gonochorica Cherm.

== See also ==
- List of Carex species
