= Cyperus antillanus =

Scientific classification
- Kingdom: Plantae
- Clade: Tracheophytes
- Clade: Angiosperms
- Clade: Monocots
- Clade: Commelinids
- Order: Poales
- Family: Cyperaceae
- Genus: Cyperus
- Species: C. antillanus

Binomial name
- Cyperus antillanus (Kük.) O'Neill

Species of sedge

Cyperus antillanus is a species of sedge that is native to western and central parts of Cuba.

== See also ==
- List of Cyperus species
