= Cyperus kipasensis =

Scientific classification
- Kingdom: Plantae
- Clade: Tracheophytes
- Clade: Angiosperms
- Clade: Monocots
- Clade: Commelinids
- Order: Poales
- Family: Cyperaceae
- Genus: Cyperus
- Species: C. kipasensis

Binomial name
- Cyperus kipasensis Cherm.

Species of plant native to Africa

Cyperus kipasensis is a species of sedge that is native to Africa, having been found growing in Angola, Chad, Zambia, Tanzania and the Democratic Republic of the Congo.

The species was first formally described by the botanist Henri Chermezon in 1934.

== See also ==
- List of Cyperus species
