= Carex kobresioidea =

Scientific classification
- Kingdom: Plantae
- Clade: Tracheophytes
- Clade: Angiosperms
- Clade: Monocots
- Clade: Commelinids
- Order: Poales
- Family: Cyperaceae
- Genus: Carex
- Species: C. kobresioidea

Binomial name
- Carex kobresioidea (Kük.) S.R.Zhang

Synonyms
- Kobresia kobresioidea (Kük.) J.Kern; Schoenoxiphium kobresioideum Kük.

Species of sedge

Carex kobresioidea is a tussock-forming perennial in the family Cyperaceae. It is endemic in northern parts of Sumatra in Indonesia.

== See also ==
- List of Carex species
