= Cyperus ekmanii =

Scientific classification
- Kingdom: Plantae
- Clade: Tracheophytes
- Clade: Angiosperms
- Clade: Monocots
- Clade: Commelinids
- Order: Poales
- Family: Cyperaceae
- Genus: Cyperus
- Species: C. ekmanii

Binomial name
- Cyperus ekmanii Kük

Species of plant native to Cuba

Cyperus ekmanii is a species of sedge that is native to an area of Cuba.

The species was first formally described by the botanist Georg Kükenthal in 1926.

== See also ==
- List of Cyperus species
