= Carex crassiflora =

Scientific classification
- Kingdom: Plantae
- Clade: Tracheophytes
- Clade: Angiosperms
- Clade: Monocots
- Clade: Commelinids
- Order: Poales
- Family: Cyperaceae
- Genus: Carex
- Species: C. crassiflora

Binomial name
- Carex crassiflora Kük., 1909

Species of sedge

Carex crassiflora is a tussock-forming perennial in the family Cyperaceae. It is native to parts of South America. Carex crassiflora is a member of the sedge genus and the sedge family.

== See also ==
- List of Carex species
