= Cyperus micrantherus =

Scientific classification
- Kingdom: Plantae
- Clade: Tracheophytes
- Clade: Angiosperms
- Clade: Monocots
- Clade: Commelinids
- Order: Poales
- Family: Cyperaceae
- Genus: Cyperus
- Species: C. micrantherus

Binomial name
- Cyperus micrantherus Cherm.

Species of plant endemic to Madagascar

Cyperus micrantherus is a species of sedge that is endemic to Madagascar.

The species was first formally described by the botanist Henri Chermezon in 1921.

== See also ==
- List of Cyperus species
