= Salma validalis =

Scientific classification
- Kingdom: Animalia
- Phylum: Arthropoda
- Class: Insecta
- Order: Lepidoptera
- Family: Pyralidae
- Genus: Salma
- Species: S. validalis

Binomial name
- Salma validalis (Walker, [1866])

Synonyms
- Calinipaxa validalis Walker, [1866]; Macalla validalis; Peucela fumosalis Warren, 1896; Pyralis costimacula Wileman & South, 1917; Scopocera minor Moore, 1888

Species of moth

Salma validalis is a species of moth of the family Pyralidae. It is found in India, Sri Lanka, Borneo and Taiwan.
