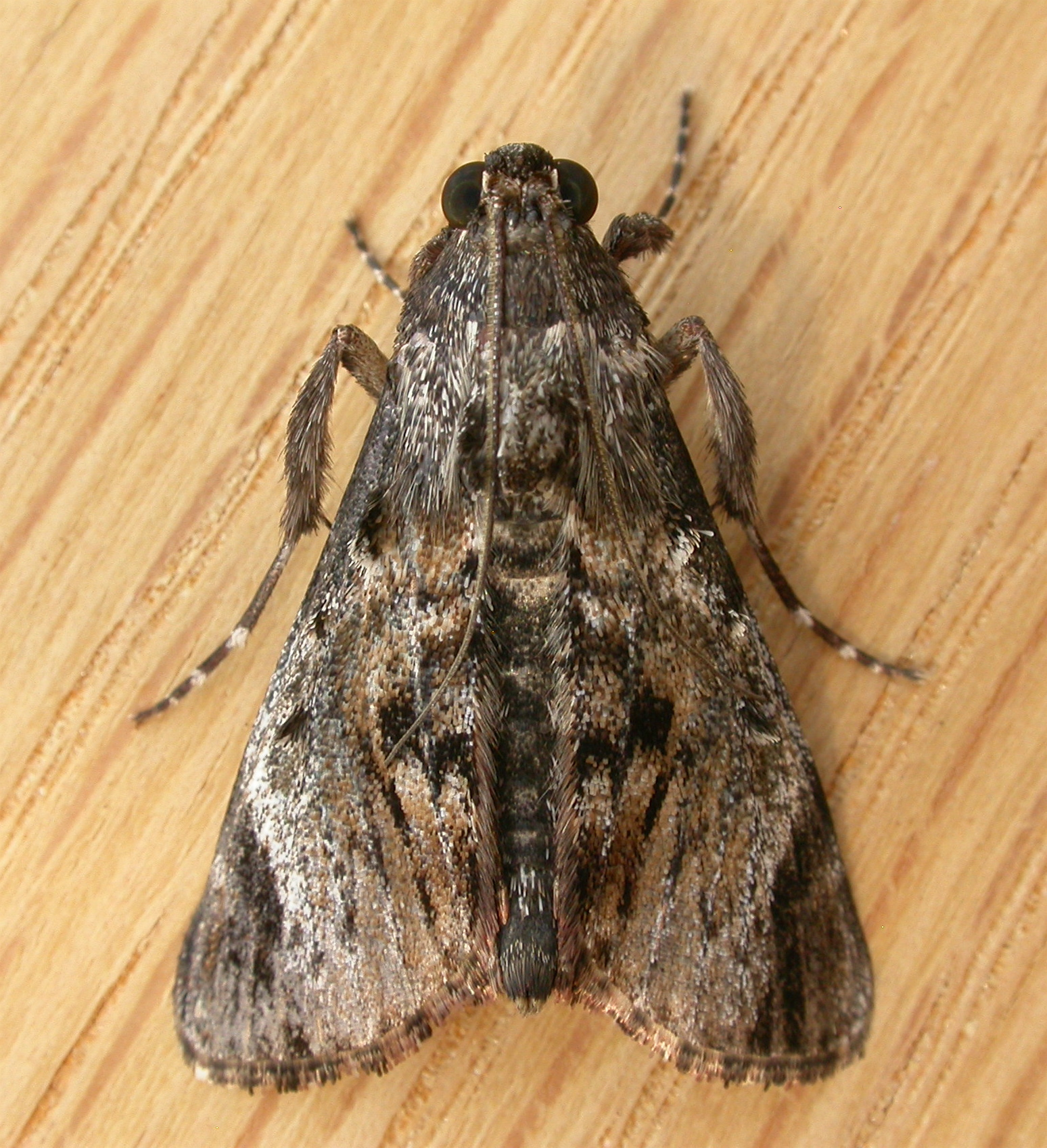
- Salma pyrastis

Scientific classification
- Domain: Eukaryota
- Kingdom: Animalia
- Phylum: Arthropoda
- Class: Insecta
- Order: Lepidoptera
- Family: Pyralidae
- Genus: Salma; Walker, 1863

Synonyms
- Exacosmia Walker, 1865; Calinipaxa Walker, [1866]; Parasarama Warren, 1890; Pseudolocastra Snellen, 1890; Pseudolocastra Warren, 1891; Orthotrichophora Warren, 1891; Heterobella Turner, 1904; Enchesphora Turner, 1913

= Salma (moth) =

Genus of moths

Salma is a genus of snout moths. It was described by Francis Walker in 1863.

== Species ==
In alphabetical order:

- Salma apicalis (Kenrick, 1907)
- Salma basiochra (Turner, 1937)
- Salma cholica (Meyrick, 1884)
- Salma cletolis (Turner, 1905)
- Salma ebenina (Turner, 1904)
- Salma eupepla (Turner, 1915)
- Salma galeata (Hampson, 1906)
- Salma glyceropa (Turner, 1937)
- Salma hicanodes (Turner, 1937)
- Salma marmorea (Warren, 1891)
- Salma mnesibrya (Meyrick, 1884)
- Salma nephelodes (Turner, 1933)
- Salma nubilalis (Hampson, 1893)
- Salma peloscia (Turner, 1913)
- Salma pentabela (Turner, 1915)
- Salma peratophaea (Turner, 1937)
- Salma poliophanes (Turner, 1913)
- Salma pyrastis (Meyrick, 1887)
- Salma recurvalis Walker, 1863
- Salma streptomela (Lower, 1896)
- Salma syrichtusalis (Walker, [1859])
- Salma tholoessa (Turner, 1926)
- Salma validalis (Walker, [1866])
