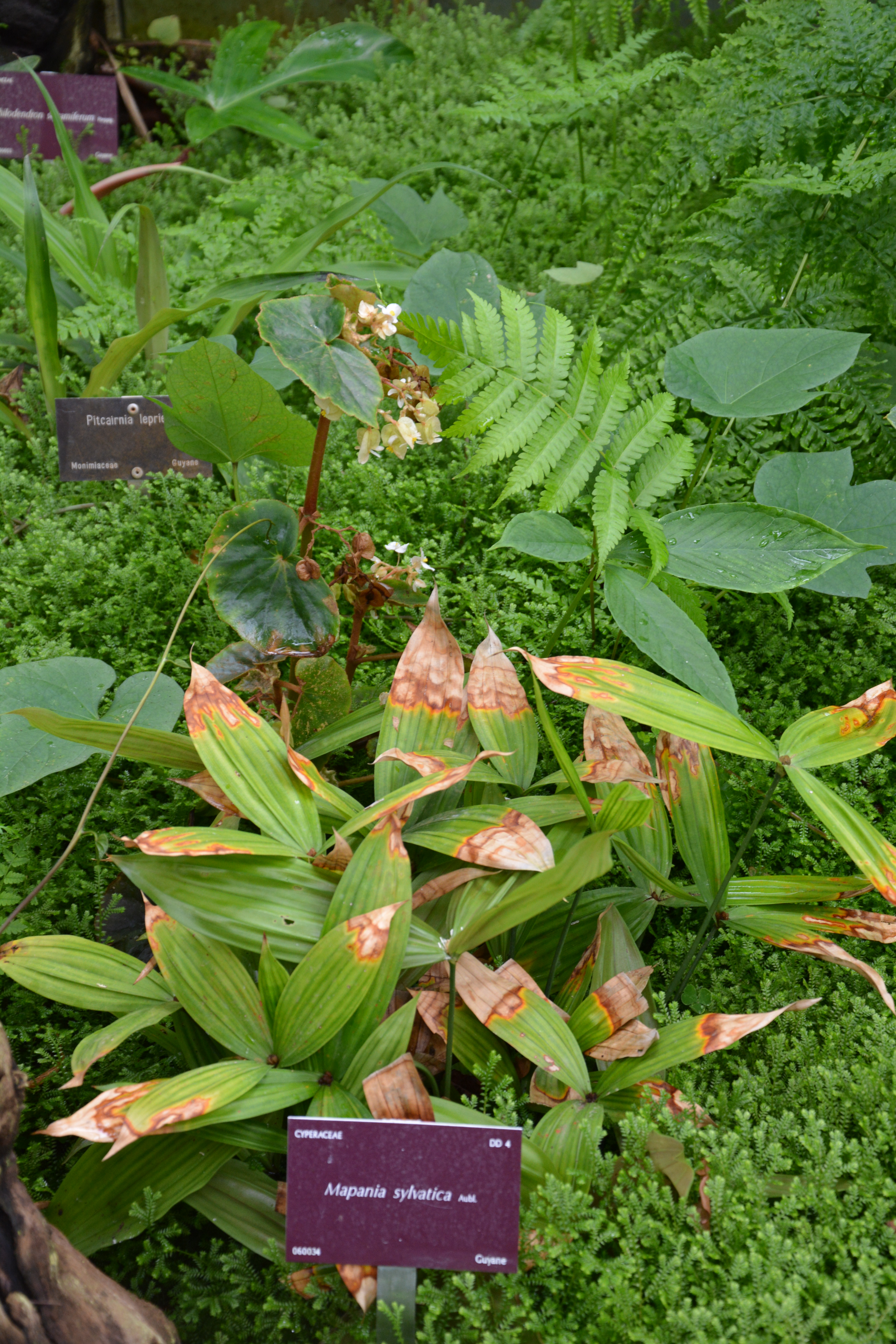
- Mapania sylvatica

Scientific classification
- Kingdom: Plantae
- Clade: Tracheophytes
- Clade: Angiosperms
- Clade: Monocots
- Clade: Commelinids
- Order: Poales
- Family: Cyperaceae
- Genus: Mapania; Aublet

Synonyms
- Apartea Pellegr.; Cephaloscirpus Kurz; Langevinia Jacq.-Fél; Lepistachya Zipp. ex Miq.; Mapaniopsis C.B.Clarke; Pandanophyllum Hassk.; Thoracostachyum Kurz

= Mapania =

Genus of grass-like plants

Mapania is a genus of plants in the family Cyperaceae. It contains 100 species, distributed in tropical regions of Africa, India, southern China, Southeast Asia, New Guinea, Australia, Central America, northern South America, and various oceanic islands.

== Species ==
105 species are currently accepted:

- Mapania africana Boeckeler
- Mapania amplivaginata K.Schum.
- Mapania angustifolia Uittien
- Mapania archboldii Uittien
- Mapania arunachalensis G.D.Pal
- Mapania assimilis T.Koyama
- Mapania aturensis D.A.Simpson
- Mapania baccifera C.B.Clarke
- Mapania balansae (E.G.Camus) T.Koyama
- Mapania baldwinii Nelmes
- Mapania ballehensis Miraadila, Shabdin & Meekiong
- Mapania bancana (Miq.) Ridl.
- Mapania bauensis Miraadila, Shabdin & Meekiong
- Mapania borneensis Merr.
- Mapania bougainvillensis D.A.Simpson
- Mapania caudata Kük.
- Mapania coodei D.A.Simpson
- Mapania coriandrum Nelmes
- Mapania cuatrecasasii T.Koyama
- Mapania cuspidata (Miq.) Uittien
- Mapania debilis C.B.Clarke
- Mapania effusa (C.B.Clarke) T.Koyama
- Mapania enodis (Miq.) C.B.Clarke
- Mapania ferruginea Ridl.
- Mapania floribunda (Nees ex Steud.) T.Koyama
- Mapania foxworthyi Merr.
- Mapania graminea Uittien
- Mapania hidiriana Miraadila, Shabdin & Meekiong
- Mapania hispida D.A.Simpson
- Mapania holttumii J.Kern
- Mapania imeriensis (Gross) T.Koyama
- Mapania immersa (Thwaites) Benth. ex C.B.Clarke
- Mapania insignis Sandwith
- Mapania ivorensis (J.Raynal) J.Raynal
- Mapania jongkindii Mesterházy
- Mapania kadimiana Shabdin, Meekiong & Miraadila
- Mapania kipas Miraadila, Shabdin & Meekiong
- Mapania kurzii C.B.Clarke
- Mapania latifolia Uittien
- Mapania lentaliffii Miraadila, Shabdin & Meekiong
- Mapania liberiensis D.A.Simpson
- Mapania linderi Hutch. ex Nelmes
- Mapania longiflora C.B.Clarke
- Mapania lorea Uittien
- Mapania macrantha (Boeckeler) H.Pfeiff.
- Mapania macrocephala (Gaudich.) K.Schum.
- Mapania macrophylla (Boeckeler) H.Pfeiff.
- Mapania maguireana T.Koyama & Steyerm.
- Mapania mangenotiana Lorougnon
- Mapania mannii C.B.Clarke
- Mapania maschalina J.Kern
- Mapania meditensis D.A.Simpson
- Mapania meekiongii Miraadila & Shabdin
- Mapania micrococca (T.Koyama) D.A.Simpson
- Mapania micropandanus Holttum
- Mapania minor (Nelmes) J.Raynal
- Mapania mirae Shabdin & Meekiong
- Mapania monostachya Uittien
- Mapania moseleyi C.B.Clarke
- Mapania multiflora Shabdin
- Mapania neblina D.A.Simpson
- Mapania nigroventralis M.T.Strong
- Mapania nudispica T.Koyama
- Mapania obscuriflora D.A.Simpson
- Mapania pacifica (Hosok.) T.Koyama
- Mapania pakaraimensis M.T.Strong
- Mapania pallescens Lye
- Mapania palustris (Hassk. ex Steud.) Fern.-Vill.
- Mapania paradoxa J.Raynal
- Mapania pedunculata D.A.Simpson
- Mapania pubisquama Cherm.
- Mapania purpuriceps (C.B.Clarke) J.Raynal
- Mapania pycnocephala (Benth.) Benth.
- Mapania pycnostachya (Benth.) T.Koyama
- Mapania raynaliana D.A.Simpson
- Mapania rhynchocarpa Lorougnon & Raynal
- Mapania richardsii Uittien
- Mapania rionegrensis D.A.Simpson
- Mapania rumputensis Shabdin & Meekiong
- Mapania sapuaniana Shabdin
- Mapania sekudaniana Melana, Shabdin & Meekiong
- Mapania sembilingensis Miraadila, Shabdin & Meekiong
- Mapania sessilis Merr.
- Mapania seychellaria D.A.Simpson
- Mapania silhetensis C.B.Clarke
- Mapania soyauxii (Boeckeler) H.Pfeiff.
- Mapania spadicea Uittien
- Mapania squamata (Kurz) C.B.Clarke
- Mapania steyermarkii T.Koyama
- Mapania sumatrana (Miq.) Benth.
- Mapania surinamensis Uittien
- Mapania sylvatica Aubl.
- Mapania tamdaoensis N.K.Khoi
- Mapania tenuiscapa C.B.Clarke
- Mapania tepuiana (Steyerm.) T.Koyama
- Mapania testui Cherm.
- Mapania theobromina D.A.Simpson
- Mapania tonkinensis (E.G.Camus) T.Koyama
- Mapania unimasiana Shabdin, Meekiong & Miraadila
- Mapania vitiensis (Uittien) T.Koyama
- Mapania waiwai M.T.Strong
- Mapania wallichii C.B.Clarke
- Mapania wokomungensis M.T.Strong
- Mapania zeylanica (Thwaites) Trimen
- Mapania zinnirahae Miraadila & Meekiong
