= Mapania ferruginea =

Conservation status
- Vulnerable (IUCN 3.1)

Scientific classification
- Kingdom: Plantae
- Clade: Tracheophytes
- Clade: Angiosperms
- Clade: Monocots
- Clade: Commelinids
- Order: Poales
- Family: Cyperaceae
- Genus: Mapania
- Species: M. ferruginea

Binomial name
- Mapania ferruginea Ridl.

Synonyms
- Mapania subcomposita C.B.Clarke

Species of grass-like plant

Mapania ferruginea is a species of plant in the sedge family, Cyperaceae. It is found in Cameroon and São Tomé and Príncipe (both São Tomé Island and Príncipe). Its natural habitat is subtropical or tropical moist montane forests. It is threatened by habitat loss.
