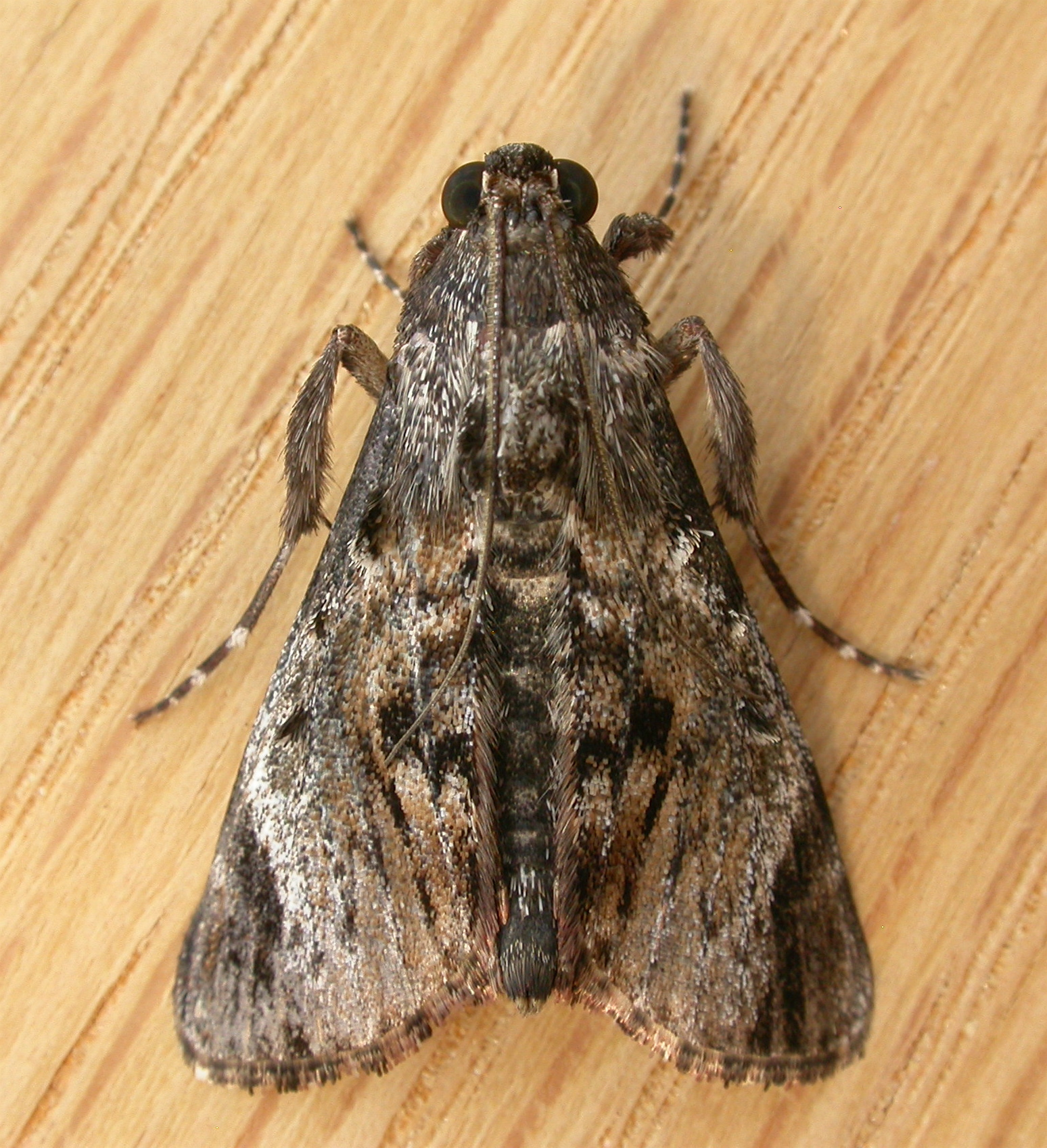

Scientific classification
- Kingdom: Animalia
- Phylum: Arthropoda
- Class: Insecta
- Order: Lepidoptera
- Family: Pyralidae
- Genus: Salma
- Species: S. pyrastis

Binomial name
- Salma pyrastis Meyrick, 1887

Synonyms
- Macalla ferruginea

= Salma pyrastis =

Species of moth

Salma pyrastis is a species of moth of the family Pyralidae. It is found in the south eastern quarter of Australia.

The wingspan is about 30 mm.

The larvae feed on Eucalyptus species.
