= Cyperus retroflexus =

Oneflower flatsedge

Scientific classification
- Kingdom: Plantae
- Clade: Tracheophytes
- Clade: Angiosperms
- Clade: Monocots
- Clade: Commelinids
- Order: Poales
- Family: Cyperaceae
- Genus: Cyperus
- Species: C. retroflexus

Binomial name
- Cyperus retroflexus Buckley

Synonyms
- C. uniflorus Torrey & Hooker

Species of plant

Cyperus retroflexus is a perennial species of sedge, commonly known as oneflower flatsedge.

It was known under the synonym C. uniflorus until the 1990s.

== See also ==
- List of Cyperus species
