= Henri Chermezon =

French botanist

- Born: 12 May 1885; Paris, French Third Republic
- Died: 15 January 1939 (aged 53); Strasbourg, French Third Republic
- Scientific career
- Fields: Botany

Henri Chermezon (12 May 1885, Paris – 15 January 1939, Strasbourg) was a French botanist.

From 1906 he worked as a botanical assistant at the Sorbonne in Paris. In 1919 he became chef des travaux in the department of botany at the University of Strasbourg, where he later served as a lecturer (maître de conférences, from 1927) and as professor (from 1929). In 1936 he was named director of its botanical garden.

He was a specialist in regards to tropical Cyperaceae (sedges), especially plants native to Madagascar. He also published works on sedges found in Senegal, Gabon, the Comoros, Belgian Congo and Ubangi-Shari. He is commemorated in the specific epithet of certain plants, examples being Carex chermezonii (Luceño & Martín-Bravo), or Cyperus chermezonianus.

== Selected works ==
- Recherches anatomiques sur les plantes littorales, 1910 – Anatomical research of littoral plants.
- Synopsis des Cypéracées de Madagascar, 1931 – Synopsis of Cyperaceae from Madagascar.
- Les Cypéracées du Haut-Oubangui, 1936 – Cyperaceae of Upper Ubangi.
- Les Cyperacées des Comores, 1936 – Cyperaceae of the Comoros.
