= Georg Kükenthal =

German pastor and botanist (1864–1955)

Georg Kükenthal (30 March 1864 in Weißenfels – 20 October 1955 in Coburg) was a German pastor and botanist who specialized in the field of caricology. He was the brother of zoologist Willy Kükenthal (1861–1922).

From 1882 to 1885 he studied theology at the universities of Tübingen and Halle. He worked as a pastor in Grub am Forst, and later in Coburg. In 1913 he received an honorary degree from the University of Breslau.

Kükenthal was a leading authority on sedges. In his 1909 monograph, he divided the genus Carex into four subgenera: Primocarex, Vignea, Indocarex and Eucarex. Carex is the largest monophyletic (natural) genus of flowering plants; Kükenthal's monograph remains the only comprehensive, worldwide treatment. On 8 July 1920 he was finally elected as the last General Superintendent and thus the highest clergyman of the independent regional church of Coburg. After the Coburg regional church joined the Bavarian regional church on 1 April 1921, Kükenthal was head of the Evangelical Lutheran deanery of Coburg until his retirement on 1 July 1928.

== Selected publications ==
- Cyperaceae-Caricoideae, etc., in Adolf Engler's Das Pflanzenreich (1909) – On Cyperaceae-Caricoideae.
- Beiträge zur Flora von Coburg und Umgebung (1930) – Contributions to the flora of Coburg and surroundings.
- Cyperaceae-Scirpoideae-Cypereae, etc., in Das Pflanzenreich (1936) – On Cyperaceae-Scirpoideae-Cypereae.

== See also ==
- Category:Taxa named by Georg Kükenthal
