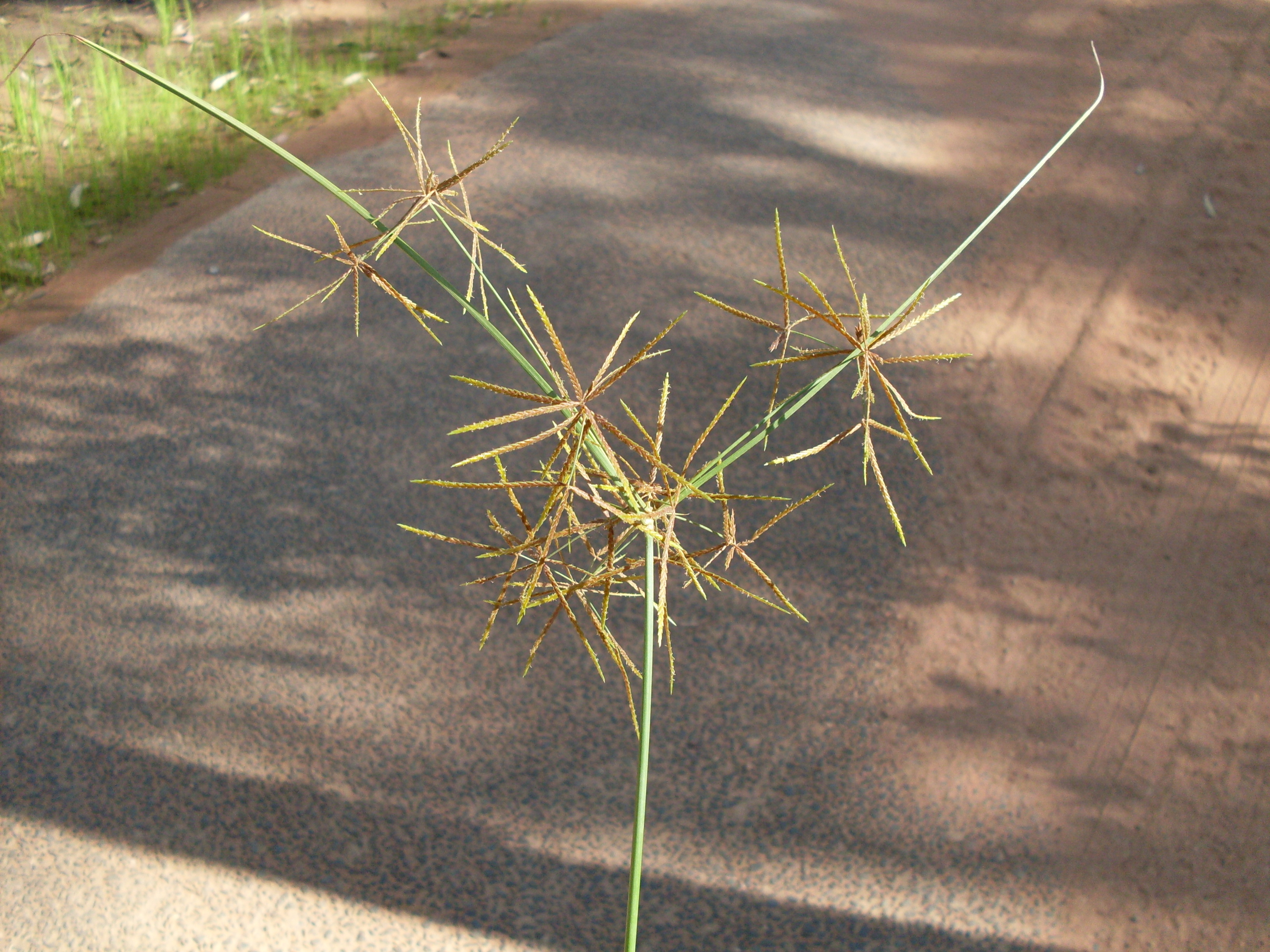

Scientific classification
- Kingdom: Plantae
- Clade: Tracheophytes
- Clade: Angiosperms
- Clade: Monocots
- Clade: Commelinids
- Order: Poales
- Family: Cyperaceae
- Genus: Cyperus
- Species: C. betchei

Binomial name
- Cyperus betchei (Kük.) S.T.Blake

= Cyperus betchei =

Species of plant native to Australia

Cyperus betchei is a sedge of the family Cyperaceae that is native to Australia.

== Description ==
The perennial sedge has a tufted habit and typically grows to a height of 0.7 to 1.2 metres (2.3 to 3.9 ft) and produces brown flowers. The nutlet is noticeably beaked. The plant has a short rhizome and smooth culms that have a circular to triangular cross section and reach a height of 35 to 100 cm (14 to 39 in) and have a diameter of 1.3 to 2.7 mm (0.051 to 0.106 in). The narrow green leaves are usually shorter than the culms and have a width of 2 to 6 mm (0.079 to 0.236 in). It produces compound inflorescences that have four to seven primary branches that have a length of about 10 cm (3.9 in) containing loosely packed spiky clusters.

=== Similar species ===
It is very similar to Cyperus angustatus, but differs from that species by being more robust, with broader leaves with a rough keel. Also, the darker, shinier spikelets are distinct and spicate, and always fall off when ripe, when in development they have a small, very acuminate beak. The winged rachilla projects.

== Taxonomy ==
The species was first collected in January 1883 in Narrabri, a town in the Australian state of New South Wales, by the German botanist Ernst Betche.

Subsequently, this holotype specimen was kept at the National Herbarium of Victoria and ignored for over half a century, until 1936, when Georg Kükenthal first described it as a variety of Cyperus angustatus in Engler's Das Pflanzenreich. Soon afterwards, in his article 1940 Notes on Australian Cyperaceae, III, published in the Proceedings of the Royal Society of Queensland, the botanist Stanley Thatcher Blake gave his opinion that the taxon should better be regarded as a full species, and formally promoted it to such, giving a somewhat revised and expanded treatment. The basionym is thus Kükenthal's C. angustatus var. betchei, which is now regarded as a homotypic synonym.

Both Kükenthal and Blake classified C. betchei in the section pinnatae Kük., a section Blake writes he considers a "most difficult group". He writes that one should not consider his taxonomy to be the final say on the subject, finding the species in this group a confusing lot (Blake mentions C. angustatus, C. betchei, C. carinatus, C. clarus, C. dactylotes, C. fulvus, C. gilesii, C. oxycarpus, C. perangustus and C. rigidellus), but that he was merely trying to advance our understanding of these sedges.

There are two known subspecies:

- Cyperus betchei subsp. betchei
- Cyperus betchei subsp. commiscens K.L.Wilson 1991

== Distribution ==
In Western Australia it is found in the Kimberley, Pilbara and Goldfields-Esperance regions. It is also found in seasonally wet areas through the Northern Territory, Queensland and New South Wales.

== Ecology ==
It grows in sandy-loamy soils in Western Australia. It grows in drier regions, with wet seasons.

== See also ==
- List of Cyperus species
