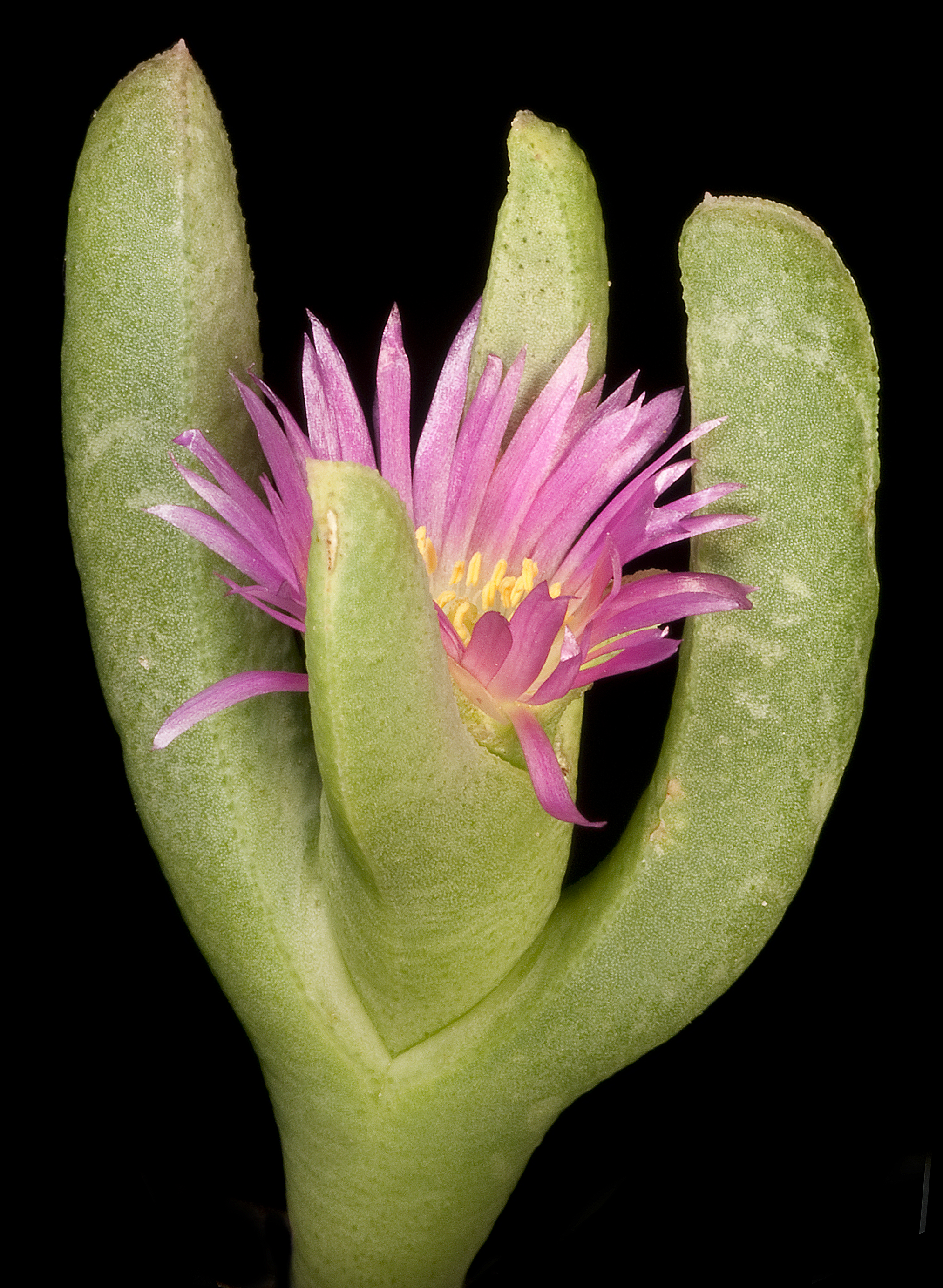

Scientific classification
- Kingdom: Plantae
- Clade: Tracheophytes
- Clade: Angiosperms
- Clade: Eudicots
- Order: Caryophyllales
- Family: Aizoaceae
- Genus: Sarcozona
- Species: S. praecox

Binomial name
- Sarcozona praecox (F.Muell.) S.T.Blake

Synonyms
- Carpobrotus praecox (F.Muell.) G.D.Rowley; Carpobrotus pulleinei J.M.Black; Mesembryanthemum praecox F.Muell.; Sarcozona pulleinei (J.M.Black) J.M.Black

= Sarcozona praecox =

Sarcozona

Species of succulent

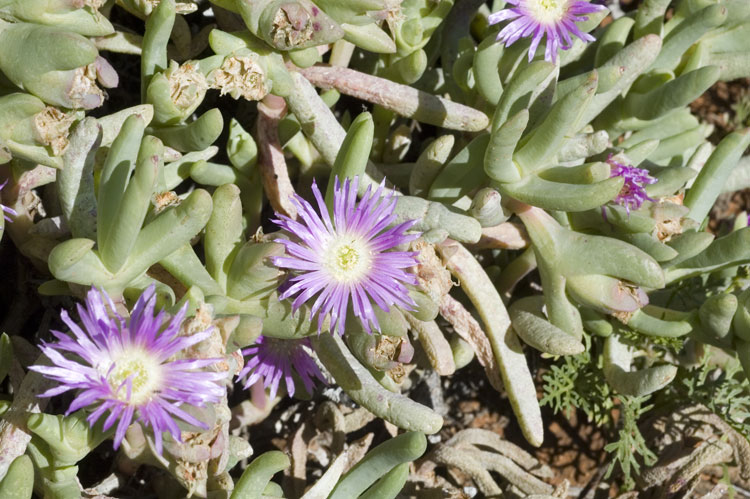
Habit in Australian Arid Lands Botanic Garden

Sarcozona praecox, commonly known as sarcozona, is species of flowering plant in the family Aizoaceae and is endemic to Australia. It is a small erect to low-lying, succulent shrub with leaves that are triangular in cross-section and arranged in opposite pairs, and daisy-like flowers with twenty to eighty pink, petal-like staminodes and 20 to 150 stamens.

== Description ==
Sarcozona bicarinata is an erect to low-lying, succulent, glabrous shrub that typically grows to a height of 30–50 cm (12–20 in) with its leaves arranged in opposite pairs, stem-clasping, 40–100 mm (1.6–3.9 in) long and 4–7 mm (0.16–0.28 in) wide. The leaves are warty, triangular in cross-section but with the sides rounded and the top flat. The flowers are arranged singly, 26–60 mm (1.0–2.4 in) wide and sessile or on a short pedicel, with two leaves fused together and partly enclosing the flowers at the base. The sepal tube is 10–15 mm (0.39–0.59 in) long with usually four lobes 3.5–10 mm (0.14–0.39 in) long. There are between twenty and eight pink, petal-like staminodes surrounding between 20 and 150 white stamens and four styles. The ovary is 4.5–9 mm (0.18–0.35 in) long and unlike S. bicarinata, lacks ribs. Flowering mainly occurs from August to November and the fruit is a succulent capsule about 10 mm (0.39 in) in diameter.

== Taxonomy ==
This species was first formally described in 1853 by Ferdinand von Mueller who gave it the name Mesembryathemum praecox in the journal Linnaea: ein Journal für die Botanik in ihrem ganzen Umfange, oder Beiträge zur Pflanzenkunde from specimens collected in the Flinders Ranges. In 1965, Stanley Thatcher Blake changed the name to Sarcozona praecox.

== Distribution ==
Sarcozona grows near salt lakes, on granite rocks and occasionally in woodland and mallee in arid areas of western New South Wales, north-western Victoria, the south-west of Western Australia, southern South Australia and southern Queensland.

== Conservation status ==
This species is classified as "not threatened" by the Government of Western Australia Department of Parks and Wildlife.
