= Melaleuca citrolens =

Gulbarn

Conservation status
- Data Deficient (IUCN 3.1)

Scientific classification
- Kingdom: Plantae
- Clade: Tracheophytes
- Clade: Angiosperms
- Clade: Eudicots
- Clade: Rosids
- Order: Myrtales
- Family: Myrtaceae
- Genus: Melaleuca
- Species: M. citrolens

Binomial name
- Melaleuca citrolens Barlow

Synonyms
- Melaleuca acacioides var. angustifolia Domin

Species of flowering plant

Melaleuca citrolens, commonly known as gulbarn, is a plant in the myrtle family, Myrtaceae and is endemic to northern Queensland and the north-eastern part of the Northern Territory. Plants in this species were originally included in Melaleuca acacioides until a review of the genus in 1986.

== Description ==
Melaleuca citrolens is a tree growing up to 10 m (30 ft) tall with grey or white papery bark. Its leaves are arranged alternately, 24–90 mm (0.9–4 in) long, 2.5–9 mm (0.1–0.4 in) wide and linear to narrow oval in shape.

The flowers are white to cream coloured, in heads up to 14–16 mm (0.55–0.63 in) in diameter with the heads containing one to 15 individual flowers. The petals are 1–1.5 mm (0.04–0.06 in) long and fall of as the flower opens. The stamens are arranged in five bundles around the flower, each bundle containing 7 to 11 stamens. Flowers appear from December to February and from April to June. The fruit which follow are woody capsules 1.5–2.3 mm (0.06–0.09 in) long.

== Taxonomy and naming ==
Melaleuca citrolens was first formally described in 1986 by Bryan Barlow in Brunonia as a new species. The specific epithet (citrolens) refers to the Rutaceae genus Citrus (which includes the orange and lemon) and to the Latin word olens meaning "smelling" or "odorous", apparently referring to the aromatic foliage.

== Distribution and habitat ==
This melaleuca is found in the north-eastern part of the Northern Territory and the northern part of Queensland including the Cape York Peninsula and occurs in melaleuca heath in association with species such as Melaleuca stenostachya, Thryptomene oligandra and Melaleuca arcana.
