= Cyperus viscidulus =

Scientific classification
- Kingdom: Plantae
- Clade: Tracheophytes
- Clade: Angiosperms
- Clade: Monocots
- Clade: Commelinids
- Order: Poales
- Family: Cyperaceae
- Genus: Cyperus
- Species: C. viscidulus

Binomial name
- Cyperus viscidulus K.L.Wilson

Species of plant

Cyperus viscidulus is a sedge of the family Cyperaceae that is native to north western Australia (found in Western Australia and the Northern Territory).

== Description ==
The rhizomatous perennial herb to grass-like sedge typically grows to a height of 0.3 to 1.15 metres (1.0 to 3.8 ft) and has a tufted habit. It blooms between February and August producing yellow-brown flowers. It has smooth and erect culms that grow to a height of 30 to 90 cm (12 to 35 in) and have a diameter of 1 to 2 mm (0.039 to 0.079 in). The leaves are usually about as long as the culms and have a flat to very V-shaped cross-section with purple-red to pale coloured sheaths at the base. The inflorescences are spreading with a length of 5 to 15 cm (2.0 to 5.9 in), the branchlets contain clusters of three to eight spikelets, each of which contain 5 to 28 compressed flowers that are 4 to 12 mm (0.16 to 0.47 in) long.

== Taxonomy ==
The species was first formally described by the botanist Karen Louise Wilson in 1980 as part of the work Notes on some Australian species of Cyperaceae as published in the journal Telopea. The only synonym is Cyperus sporobolus var. sexflorus but the species is often incorrectly identified as Cyperus carinatus or Cyperus sporobolus. The holotype was collected just north Bow River Station in the Kimberley region of Western Australia in 1955 by M.Lazarides.

== Distribution ==
In Western Australia it is found along streams and creeks and surrounding water holes in the Kimberley region where it grows in sandy alluvial soils often around sandstone. It is also found in western parts of the top end of the Northern Territory.

== See also ==
- List of Cyperus species
