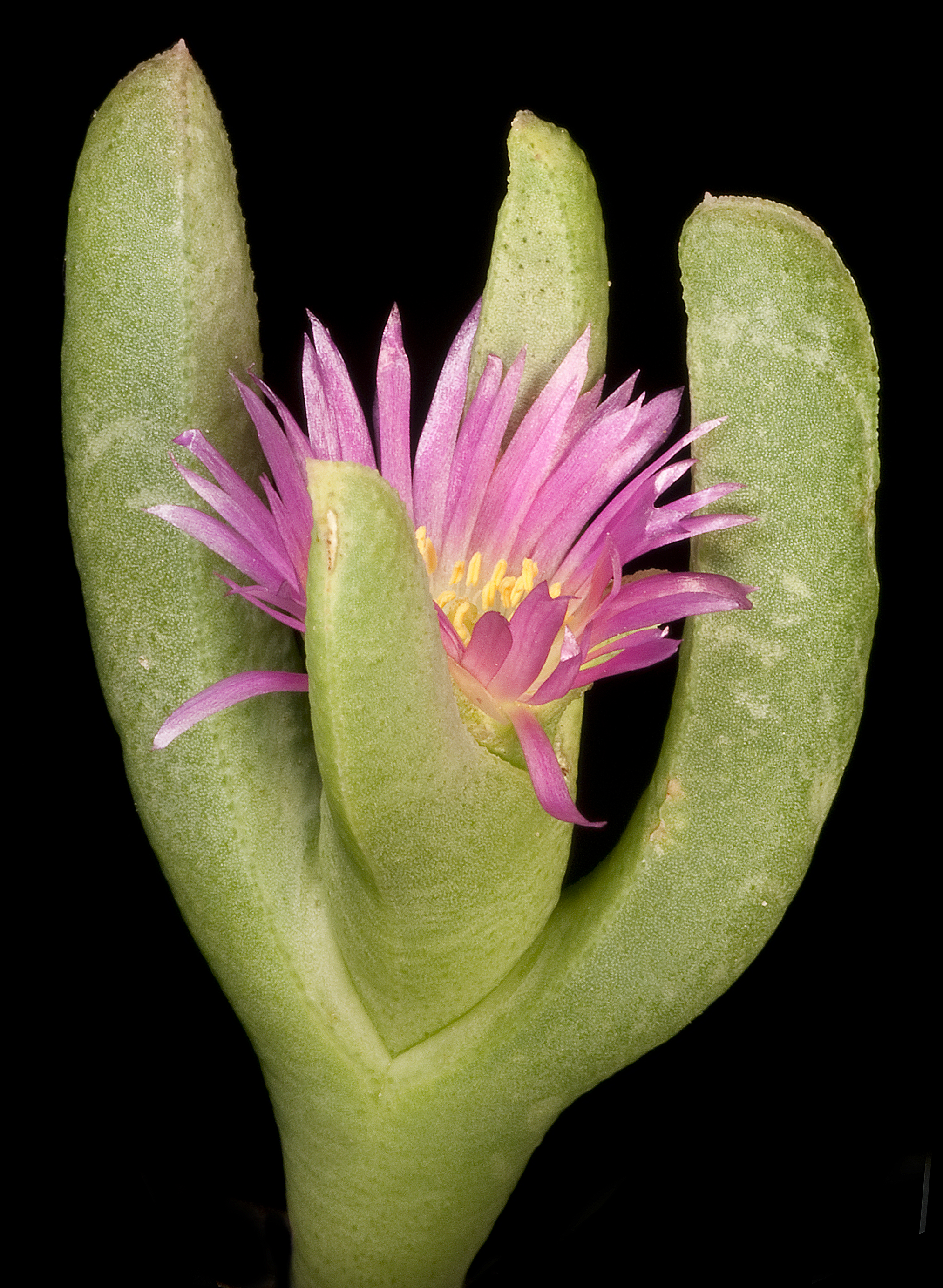
- Sarcozona praecox

Scientific classification
- Kingdom: Plantae
- Clade: Tracheophytes
- Clade: Angiosperms
- Clade: Eudicots
- Order: Caryophyllales
- Family: Aizoaceae
- Subfamily: Ruschioideae
- Tribe: Ruschieae
- Genus: Sarcozona; J.M.Black

= Sarcozona =

Pigfaces

Genus of succulents

Sarcozona, commonly known as pigfaces, is a genus of two species of flowering plants in the family Aizoaceae, both species endemic to Australia. They are small, erect or low-lying, succulent perennials with leaves that are triangular in cross-section and arranged in opposite pairs, and daisy-like flowers with twenty to eighty petal-like staminodes and up to 150 stamens.

== Description ==
Plants in the genus Sarcozona are small, erect to low-lying or more or less prostrate, succulent, glabrous perennials with sessile leaves arranged in opposite pairs, stem-clasping and triangular in cross-section. The flowers are daisy-like and arranged singly or in pairs with two leaves fused together and partly enclosing the flowers. The perianth is tube-shaped with four or five lobes, with between twenty and eighty petal-like staminodes surrounding between 20 and 150 white stamens and four styles. The fruit is a succulent capsule containing a large number of seeds.

== Taxonomy ==
The genus Sarcozona was first formally described in 1934 by John McConnell Black in Transactions and Proceedings of the Royal Society of South Australia. The first species he described was S. pulleinei, now known as S. praecox.

=== Species list ===
The following species are accepted by the Australian Plant Census as at October 2020:

- Sarcozona bicarinata S.T.Blake – S.A., W.A.
- Sarcozona praecox (F.Muell.) S.T.Blake – N.S.W., Qld., S.A., Vic., W.A.
