= Cyperus perangustus =

Scientific classification
- Kingdom: Plantae
- Clade: Tracheophytes
- Clade: Angiosperms
- Clade: Monocots
- Clade: Commelinids
- Order: Poales
- Family: Cyperaceae
- Genus: Cyperus
- Species: C. perangustus

Binomial name
- Cyperus perangustus S.T.Blake 1940

Species of sedge

Cyperus perangustus is a species of sedge that is native to north eastern parts of Australia.

== See also ==
- List of Cyperus species
