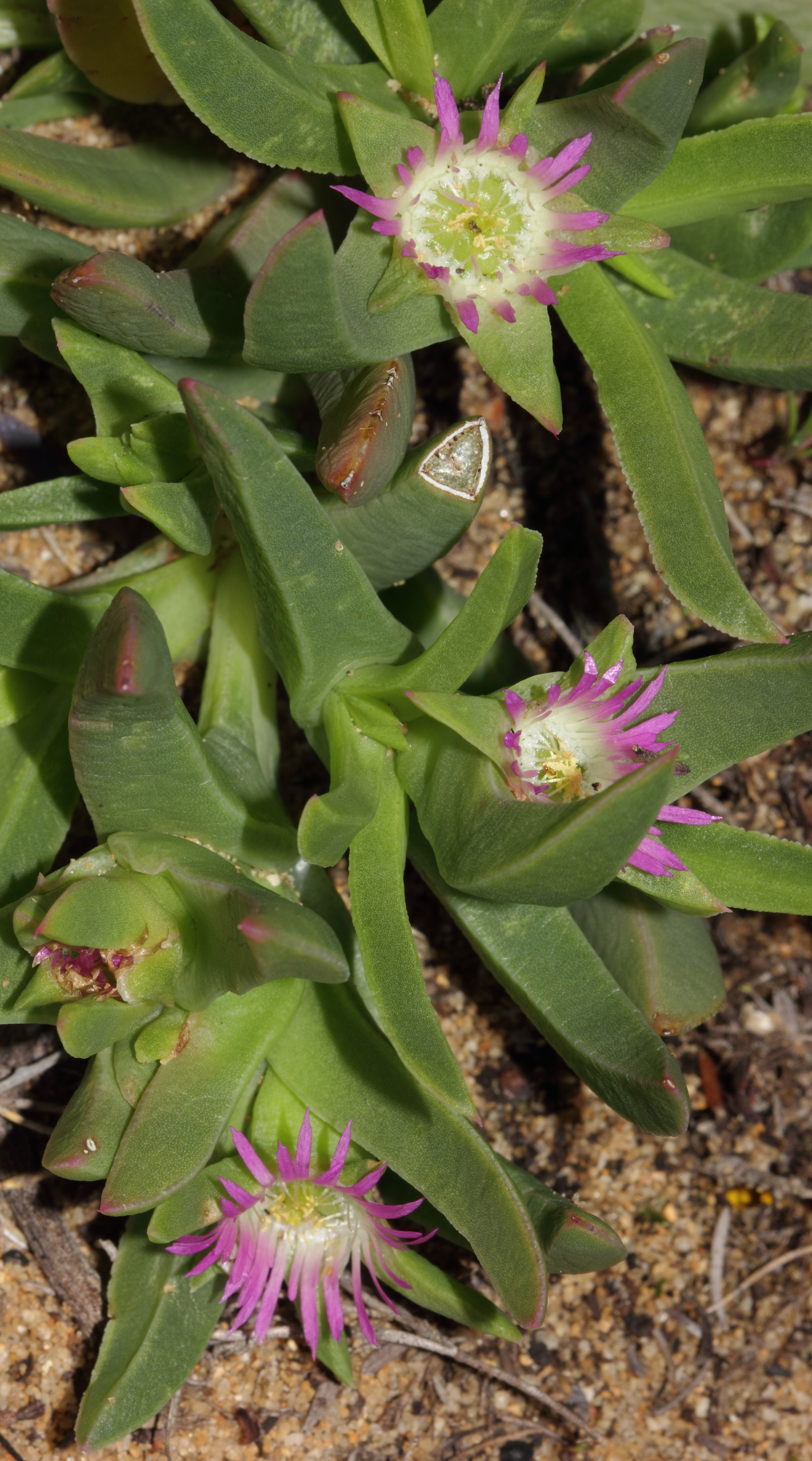

Conservation status
- Priority Three — Poorly Known Taxa (DEC)

Scientific classification
- Kingdom: Plantae
- Clade: Tracheophytes
- Clade: Angiosperms
- Clade: Eudicots
- Order: Caryophyllales
- Family: Aizoaceae
- Genus: Sarcozona
- Species: S. bicarinata

Binomial name
- Sarcozona bicarinata J.M.Black

= Sarcozona bicarinata =

Ridged noon-flower

Species of succulent

Sarcozona bicarinata, commonly known as ridged noon-flower, is species of flowering plant in the family Aizoaceae and is endemic to Australia. It is a small shrub with leaves that are triangular in cross-section and arranged in opposite pairs, and daisy-like flowers with twenty to fifty-five petal-like staminodes and twenty to fifty stamens.

== Description ==
Sarcozona bicarinata is an erect, succulent glabrous shrub that typically grows to a height of 10 cm (3.9 in) with sessile leaves arranged in opposite pairs, stem-clasping, 25–50 mm (0.98–1.97 in) long and 5–9 mm (0.20–0.35 in) wide. The leaves are triangular in cross-section but with the sides rounded and the top flat, the edges tinged with pink. The flowers are arranged singly or in pairs with two leaves fused together and partly enclosing the flowers. The sepal tube is bell-shaped or cup-shaped 4.5–9 mm (0.18–0.35 in) long with four or five lobes, and there are between twenty and fifty-five petal-like staminodes surrounding between twenty and fifty white stamens and five styles. The ovary is 4.5–9 mm (0.18–0.35 in) long and has two characteristic ribs. Flowering occurs from August to December and the fruit is a succulent capsule 7–15 mm (0.28–0.59 in) long.

== Taxonomy ==
Sarcozona bicarinata was first formally described in 1969 by Stanley Thatcher Blake in Contributions from the Queensland Herbarium from specimens collected by R.L. Specht near Lock in South Australia.

== Distribution ==
Ridged noon-flower occurs on the Yorke and Eyre Peninsulas and there are records from the Swan Coastal Plain biogeographic region in Western Australia.

== Conservation status ==
This species is classified as in Western Australia as "Priority Three" by the Government of Western Australia Department of Parks and Wildlife meaning that it is poorly known and known from only a few locations but is not under imminent threat.
