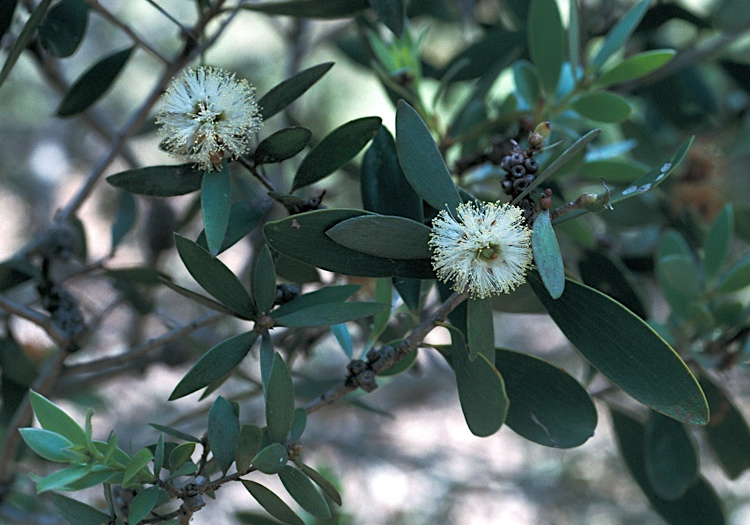

Conservation status
- Least Concern (IUCN 3.1)

Scientific classification
- Kingdom: Plantae
- Clade: Embryophytes
- Clade: Tracheophytes
- Clade: Spermatophytes
- Clade: Angiosperms
- Clade: Eudicots
- Clade: Rosids
- Order: Myrtales
- Family: Myrtaceae
- Genus: Melaleuca
- Species: M. arcana

Binomial name
- Melaleuca arcana S.T.Blake

Synonyms
- Melaleuca leucadendra f. ruscifolia Cheel

= Melaleuca arcana =

Species of shrub

Melaleuca arcana is a small tree or large shrub in the myrtle family, Myrtaceae and is endemic to Cape York Peninsula in northern Australia. It has papery bark and small heads of white flowers in summer.

== Description ==
Melaleuca arcana grows to a height of 0.5–15 m (2–50 ft) and has whitish, papery bark. Its leaves are arranged alternately, 23–75 mm (0.9–3 in) long, 7–26 mm (0.3–1 in) wide, broadly egg-shaped with a blunt tip and with 5 to 11 parallel veins.

The flowers are white or cream, sometimes pinkish and arranged in heads on the ends of branches which continue to grow after flowering and in the upper leaf axils. The heads are up to 18 mm (0.7 in) in diameter and contain between 5 and 11 groups of flowers in threes. The stamens are arranged in 5 bundles around the flowers and each bundle contains 6 to 9 stamens. Flowering occurs unpredictably throughout the year and is followed by fruit which are woody capsules 2.5–4 mm (0.1–0.2 in) long, arranged in cylindrical spikes. The seeds are released within a year when the fruits are mature.

== Taxonomy and naming ==
The species was first formally described in 1968 by Stanley Thatcher Blake from a specimen collected north-west of Cooktown and west of Cape Bedford in Three Islands National Park. The specific epithet (arcana) is from the Latin arcanus, meaning "secret" or "mysterious" in reference to the species' apparent rarity.

== Distribution and habitat ==
Melaleuca incana occurs on the east coast of Cape York Peninsula in the swales between sand dunes.

== Conservation status ==
This melaleuca has the status of least concern in the Government of Queensland Nature Conservation Act 1992.

== Uses ==
=== Agroforestry ===
This species is useful for sand stabilisation in coastal areas and it is a good source of honey.

=== Timber ===
The wood can be used for posts and railway ties.

=== Horticulture ===
In some situations this species may be preferable to Melaleuca leucadendron as a street tree because of its smaller size at maturity. It has been grown as far south as Brisbane.
