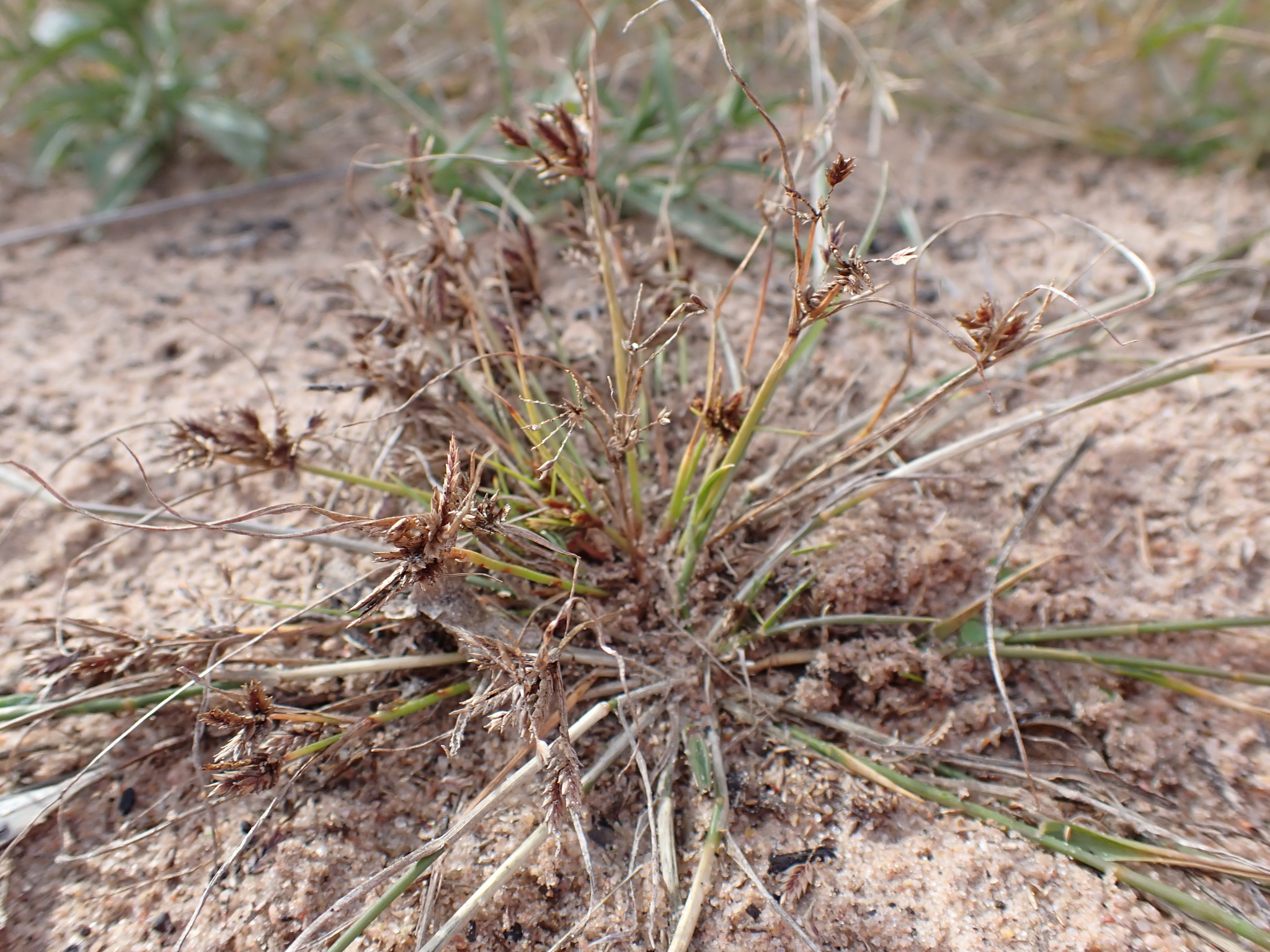

Scientific classification
- Kingdom: Plantae
- Clade: Tracheophytes
- Clade: Angiosperms
- Clade: Monocots
- Clade: Commelinids
- Order: Poales
- Family: Cyperaceae
- Genus: Cyperus
- Species: C. rigidellus

Binomial name
- Cyperus rigidellus (Benth.) J.M.Black

Synonyms
- List: Mariscus rigidellus; Cyperus subpinnatus; Cyperus subpinnatus var. subrigidellus; Cyperus subpinnatus var. subpinnatus; Cyperus gracilis var. rigidellus; Cyperus gracilis var. rigidella

= Cyperus rigidellus =

Species of sedge plant

Cyperus rigidellus is a species of sedge in the family Cyperaceae that is native to Australia.

== Description ==
The short-lived perennial or annual, herbaceous, grass-like sedge typically grows to a height of 5 to 40 centimetres (1.97 to 15.75 in). The terete culms are three sided with sharp edges and concave sides and are often rough higher up. The culms are typically 3 to 25 cm (1.2 to 9.8 in) in length and have a diameter of 0.6 to 1.3 mm (0.024 to 0.051 in). The leaves are usually longer than the culms and often curly at the apex and have a width of around 3 mm (0.12 in). It blooms between April and November producing brown-red flowers. The head-like or simple inflorescence has one to four branches that 1 to 6 cm (0.39 to 2.36 in) in length. Each inflorescence is loosely or densely clustered with a globose shape and around 30 mm (1.2 in) in diameter. The flattened spikelets occur in clusters of 5 to 15 each containing 6 to 25 flowers. Each spikelet is 4 to 25 mm (0.16 to 0.98 in) in length and 2.5 to 4 mm (0.098 to 0.157 in) wide. After flowering trigonous pale brown nuts form with a narrow-obovoid to narrow-ellipsoid shape.

== Taxonomy ==
The species was initially confused with Cyperus gilesii and C. enervis. It was first formally described as a variety of C. gracilis by the botanist George Bentham in 1878 (as C. gracilis var. rigidellus). Charles Baron Clarke promoted it to the independent species Mariscus rigidellus in 1908, John McConnell Black moved it back to Cyperus in 1929 as part of the work Additions and Corrections as published in Flora of South Australia. There are several synonyms.

== Distribution ==
It is found in all mainland states and territories in Australia. In Western Australia it is found along stream and creek, around clay pans, on flood plains and other damp areas in the Mid West, Pilbara, Gascoyne and Goldfields-Esperance regions where it grows in loamy-sand or clay-sand soils. In New South Wales it is found in inland areas usually in ephemerally wet places including floodways and roadside drains.

== See also ==
- List of Cyperus species
