= Cyperus oxycarpus =

Scientific classification
- Kingdom: Plantae
- Clade: Tracheophytes
- Clade: Angiosperms
- Clade: Monocots
- Clade: Commelinids
- Order: Poales
- Family: Cyperaceae
- Genus: Cyperus
- Species: C. oxycarpus

Binomial name
- Cyperus oxycarpus S.T.Blake

Species of plant

Cyperus oxycarpus is a sedge of the family Cyperaceae that is native to Australia.

The rhizomatous perennial sedge typically grows to a height of 0.3 to 0.9 metres (1.0 to 3.0 ft) and has a tufted habit. It blooms between March and April and produces brown flowers.

In Western Australia it is found around wet areas in the Kimberley region where it grows in clay soils.

== See also ==
- List of Cyperus species
