= Cyperus enervis =

Scientific classification
- Kingdom: Plantae
- Clade: Tracheophytes
- Clade: Angiosperms
- Clade: Monocots
- Clade: Commelinids
- Order: Poales
- Family: Cyperaceae
- Genus: Cyperus
- Species: C. enervis

Binomial name
- Cyperus enervis R.Br

Species of plant endemic to Australia

Cyperus enervis is a species of sedge that is endemic to eastern Australia.

The species was first formally described by the botanist Robert Brown in 1810 as a part of the work Prodromus florae Novae Hollandiae et insulae Van-Diemen, exhibens characteres plantarum quas annis 1802-1805.

== See also ==
- List of Cyperus species
