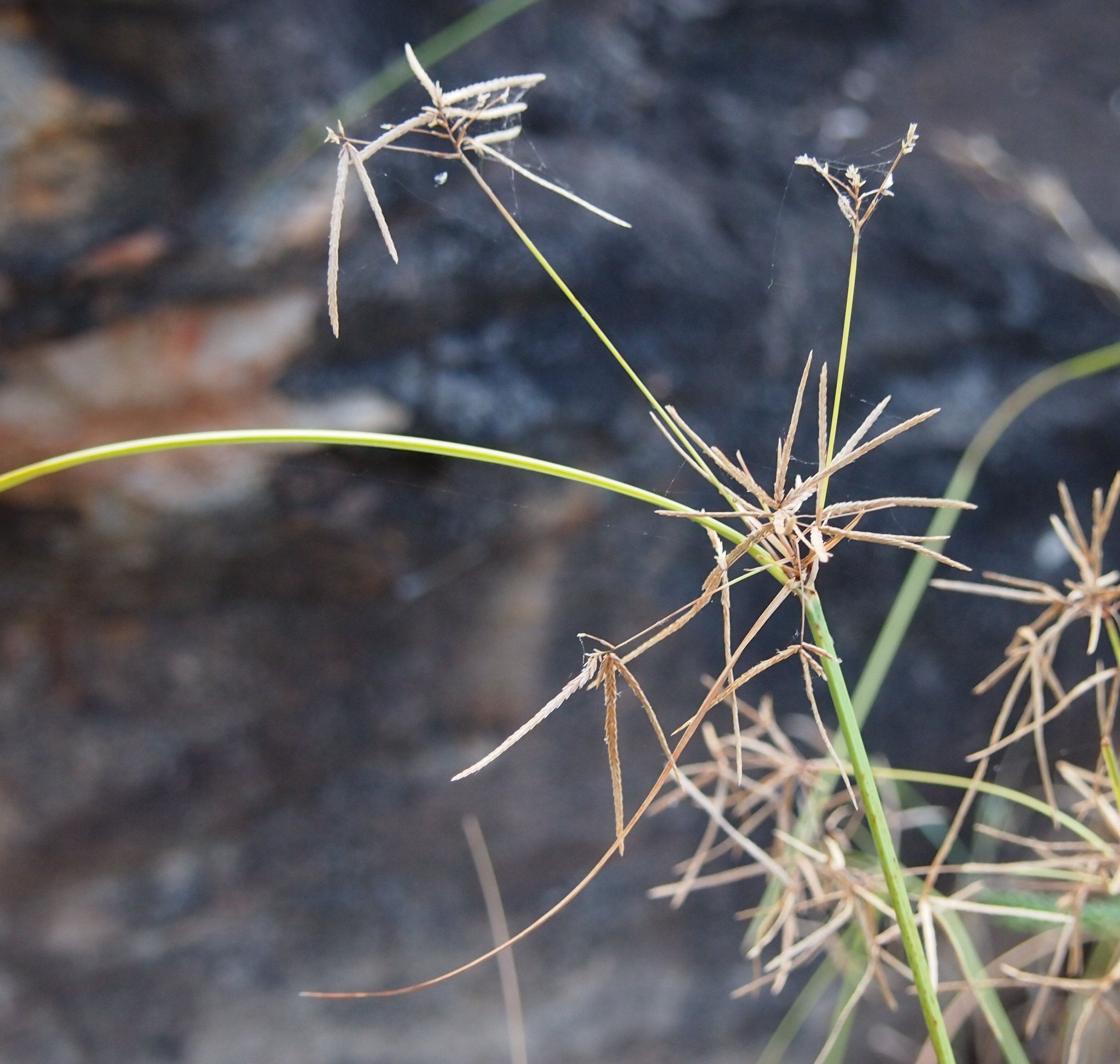
- Cyperus dactylotes

Scientific classification
- Kingdom: Plantae
- Clade: Tracheophytes
- Clade: Angiosperms
- Clade: Monocots
- Clade: Commelinids
- Order: Poales
- Family: Cyperaceae
- Genus: Cyperus
- Species: C. dactylotes

Binomial name
- Cyperus dactylotes Benth.

= Cyperus dactylotes =

Species of plant

Cyperus dactylotes is a sedge of the family Cyperaceae that is native to all of mainland Australia except for Victoria.

== Description ==
The perennial rhizomatous sedge typically grows to a height of 0.4 to 1.2 metres (1.3 to 3.9 ft) and has a tufted habit. The trigonous or terete culms are smooth with a height of 45 to 100 cm (18 to 39 in) and a diameter of 2.5 to 4.5 mm (0.098 to 0.177 in). It has septate to nodulose leaves of about the same length as the culms with a width of about 6.5 mm (0.26 in). It blooms between May and July producing green-yellow-brown flowers. The compound or decompound inflorescence will commonly have many primary branches to a length of 14 cm (5.5 in) with sub-digitate clusters that are spherical to hemispherical and have a diameter of 10 to 30 mm (0.39 to 1.18 in).

== Distribution ==
It is found in creek beds, roadside drains and other damp areas in Western Australia, South Australia, the Northern Territory, Queensland and New South Wales. In Western Australia it is found in the Kimberley and Pilbara regions of Western Australia where it grows in sand-loam-clay soils. In New South Wales it is found from around the White Cliffs area to the borders in the north west of the state. It is usually situated in damp areas such as along stream banks growing in sandy to loamy or clay soils.

== See also ==
- List of Cyperus species
