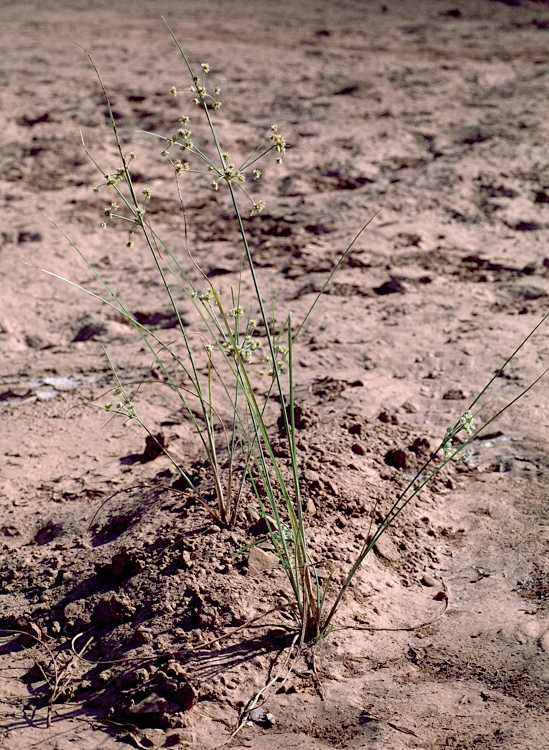
- Growing in Western Australia

Scientific classification
- Kingdom: Plantae
- Clade: Tracheophytes
- Clade: Angiosperms
- Clade: Monocots
- Clade: Commelinids
- Order: Poales
- Family: Cyperaceae
- Genus: Cyperus
- Species: C. carinatus

Binomial name
- Cyperus carinatus R.Br.

= Cyperus carinatus =

Species of plant native to Australia

Cyperus carinatus is a sedge of the family Cyperaceae that is native to northern Australia.

The rhizomatous perennial sedge typically grows to a height of 0.5 to 1 metre (1.6 to 3.3 ft) and has a caespitose habit. The plant blooms between March and August producing brown flowers.

In Western Australia it is found around creeks and rivers in the Kimberley region where it grows in sandy soils. It is also found in the Northern Territory and in Queensland.

== See also ==
- List of Cyperus species
