= Stanley Thatcher Blake =

Australian botanist (1910–1973)

Stanley Thatcher Blake (1910 – 24 February 1973) was an Australian botanist who served as president of the Royal Society of Queensland and who was associated with the Queensland Herbarium beginning in 1945 until his death.

== Background ==
Prior to his stint with the Herbarium, Blake received a Walter and Eliza Hall Fellowship which allowed him to undertake botanical collecting expeditions to Western Queensland (1935–1937).

Blake is also credited with validating the name Melaleuca quinquenervia, which was initially proposed by Antonio José Cavanilles (1745–1804).

The standard author abbreviation S.T. Blake is used to indicate this person as the author when citing a botanical name.
