= Umbrella flatsedge =

Umbrella flatsedge may refer to:

- Cyperus alterniflorus, a sedge found in Australia
- Cyperus diandrus, a sedge found in North America
