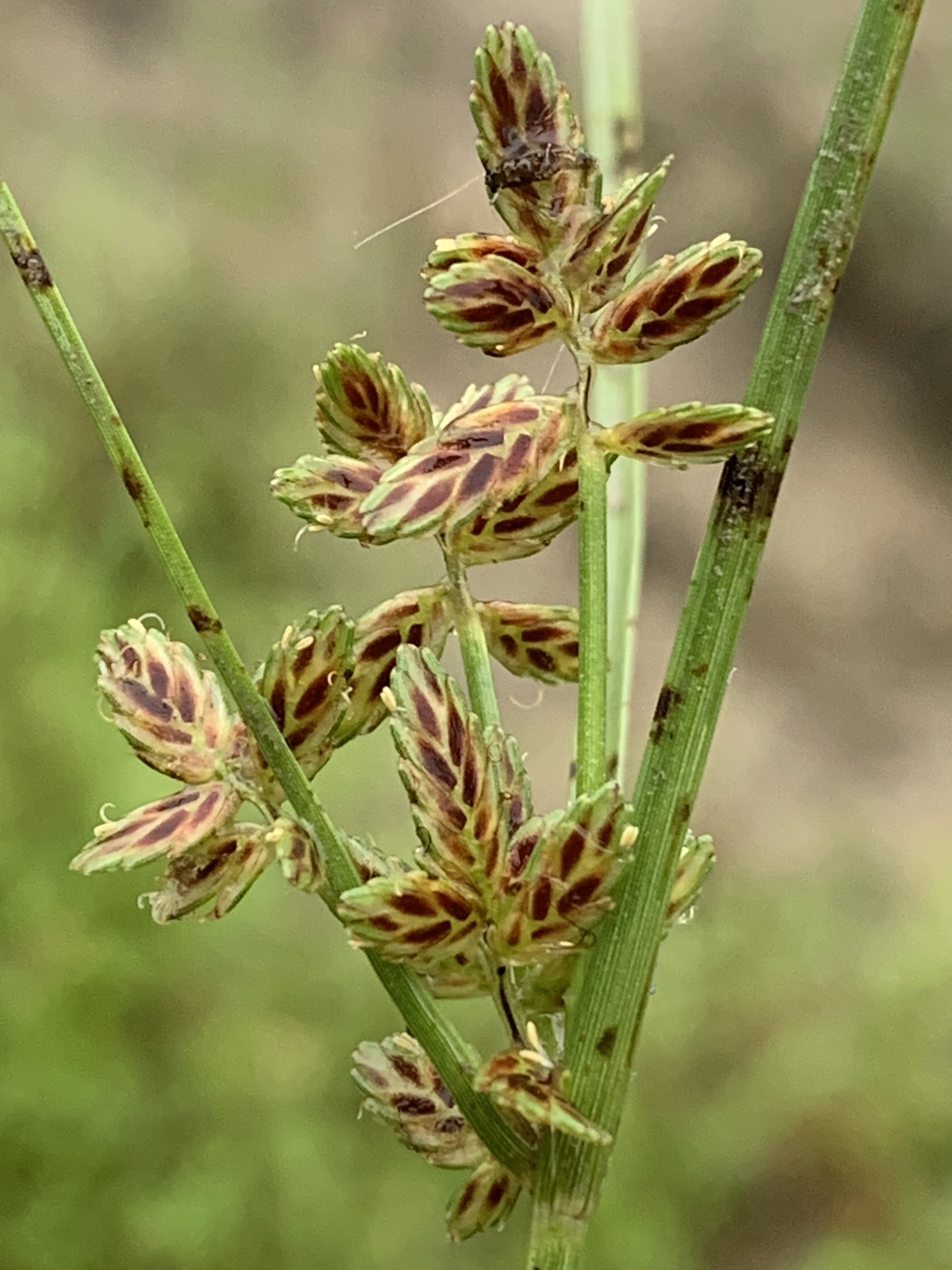
- Thames River, Ontario

Conservation status
- Least Concern (IUCN 3.1)

- Secure (NatureServe)

Scientific classification
- Kingdom: Plantae
- Clade: Tracheophytes
- Clade: Angiosperms
- Clade: Monocots
- Clade: Commelinids
- Order: Poales
- Family: Cyperaceae
- Genus: Cyperus
- Species: C. bipartitus

Binomial name
- Cyperus bipartitus Torr.

Synonyms
- Homotypic synonyms: Cyperus diandrus var. bipartitus (Torr.) Kük.; Pycreus bipartitus (Torr.) C.B.Clarke; Heterotypic synonyms: Chlorocyperus rivularis (Kunth) Rikli; Cyperus angustifolius A.Dietr.; Cyperus argentinus C.B.Clarke; Cyperus bicolor Barton; Cyperus bigelowii Steud.; Cyperus bipartitus f. elongatus (Boeckeler) Mohlenbr.; Cyperus bipartitus f. elutus (C.B.Clarke) Mohlenbr.; Cyperus castaneus Bigelow; Cyperus diandrus var. castaneus (Pursh) Torr.; Cyperus flavescens var. bicolor Farw.; Cyperus flavescens var. castaneus Pursh; Cyperus lagunetto Steud.; Cyperus niger var. rivularis (Kunth) V.E.Grant; Cyperus pauper Phil.; Cyperus rivularis Kunth; Cyperus rivularis var. acutatus C.B.Clarke; Cyperus rivularis f. acutatus (C.B.Clarke) Kük.; Cyperus rivularis var. depauperatus C.B.Clarke; Cyperus rivularis f. depauperatus (C.B.Clarke) Kük.; Cyperus rivularis var. elongatus Boeckeler; Cyperus rivularis var. elutus C.B.Clarke; Cyperus rivularis f. elutus (C.B.Clarke) Kük.; Cyperus rivularis subsp. lagunetto (Steud.) Kük.; Cyperus rivularis var. lagunetto (Steud.) O'Neill; Cyperus rivularis f. subacaulis Kük.; Cyperus tenuiculus Kunth; Pycreus lagunetto (Steud.) C.B.Clarke; Pycreus rivularis (Kunth) Palla

= Cyperus bipartitus =

Species of flowering plant

Cyperus bipartitus, also known as slender flatsedge, river cyperus, or shining flatsedge, is a species of flowering plant in the sedge family Cyperaceae. It is native to the Americas, from southeastern Canada to northern Argentina. In the United States, its season runs from July to October but little else is known about its ecology. It is often confused with Cyperus diandrus, both of which have chestnut-brown scales protecting the flowers. It may also be confused with Cyperus gracilis, another species known as "slender flatsedge". The name "shining flatsedge" refers to the shiny appearance of its heavily pigmented floral scales.

The taxon known as Cyperus bipartitus was described as a variety of Cyperus diandrus by John Torrey in 1836. Torrey noted the variety was commonly found in New England, western New York State, and Pennsylvania, and went on to describe a taxon that "is very distinct from Cyperus diandrus". For most of the 19th century, botanists considered Cyperus bipartitus to be a variety of Cyperus diandrus.

== Description ==
Cyperus bipartitus is an annual sedge with fibrous roots. It has a cespitose (tufted) growth habit, with multiple stems at the base of the plant. A stem rarely exceeds 25 cm (9.8 in) in height. Above the stem, the inflorescence bears clusters of spikelets, each with numerous florets. There are 2–3 leaf-like bracts at the base of the inflorescence. The main cluster of spikelets at the top of the stem is stalkless, accompanied by 0–4 additional clusters on stalks up to 3 cm long. Each cluster supports 3–10 flattened spikelets. The terminal spikelet is usually erect. A spikelet consists of 10–26 florets, each covered by a scale (a type of bract in sedges and grasses). Each floret has two (occasionally three) anthers and a branched style with two stigmas. A perianth is absent. The anthers and stigmas emerge from the axil of the floral scale. The fruit is an achene, a black disc about a millimeter wide.

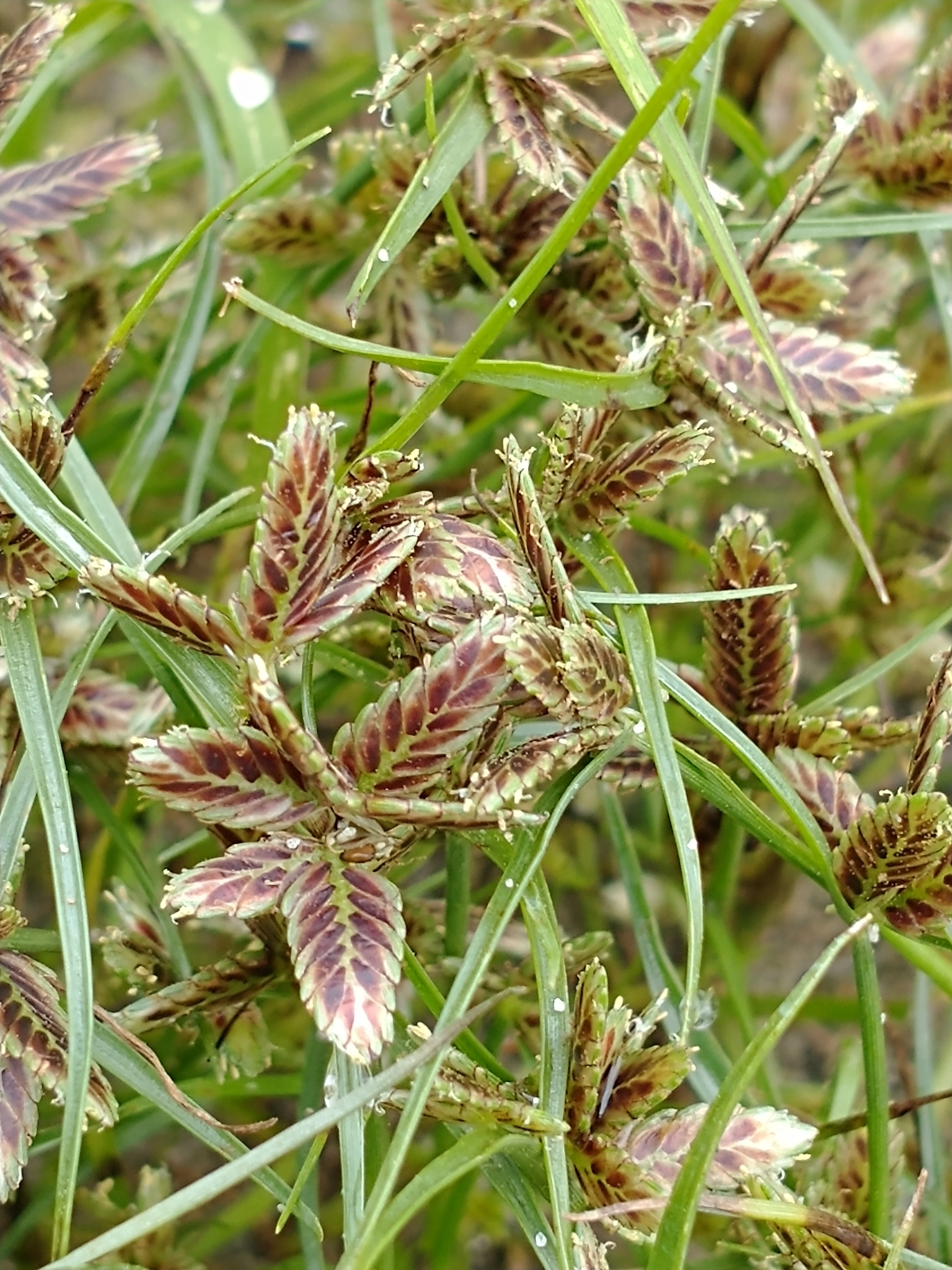
Lake Champlain, Vermont (Sep)

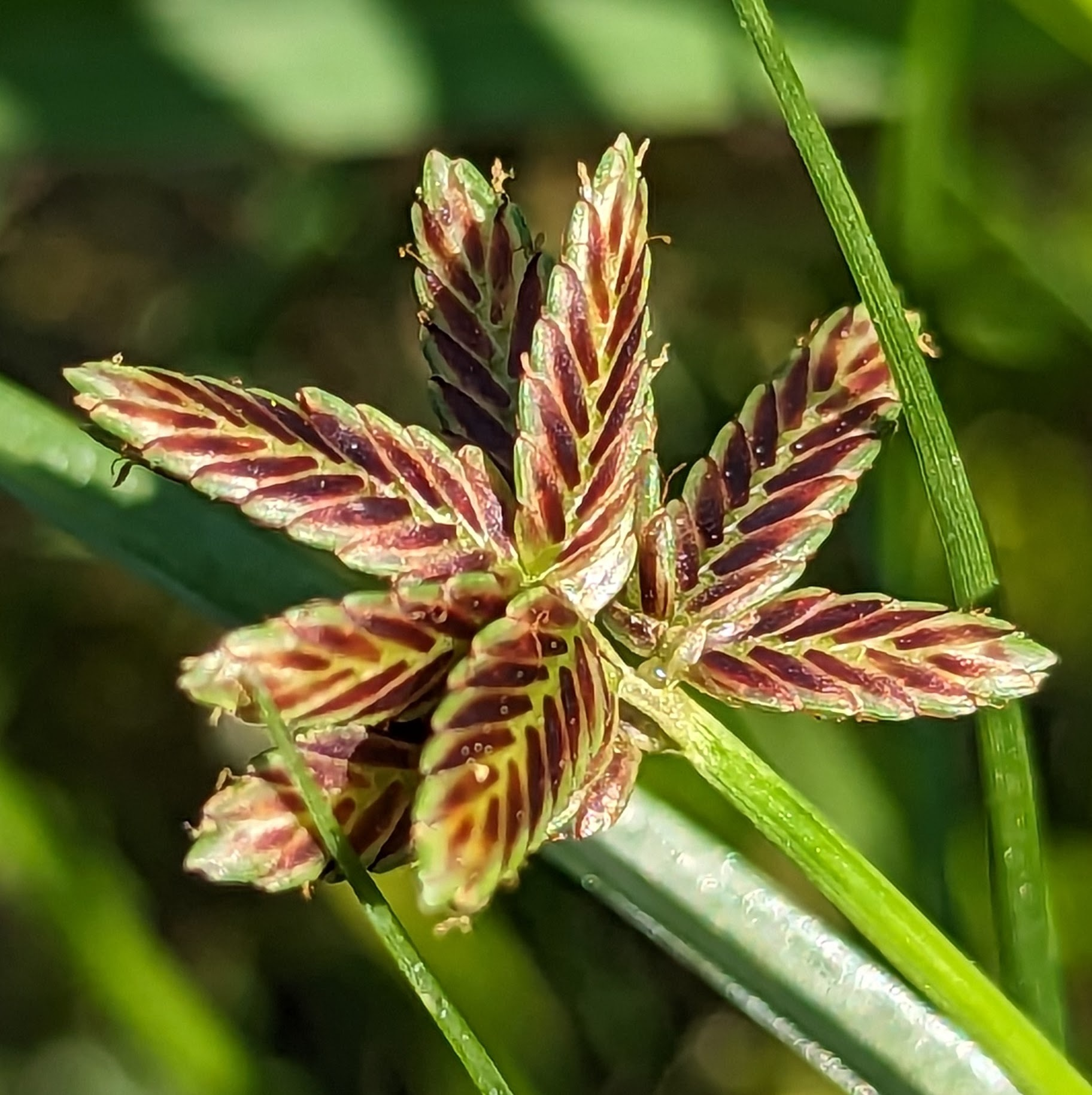
Close-up of spikelets, Ohio (Aug)

Cyperus bipartitus is often confused with Cyperus diandrus, both of which have pigmented floral scales ranging in color from reddish-brown to purplish-brown. The two species may be distinguished by the pigmented pattern on the surface of the scales. Cyperus diandrus has a thin band of pigment along the scale's margin, with a conspicuous pale area on the face of the scale. Cyperus bipartitus is more heavily pigmented such that a pale area is lacking. Occasionally the scales will be entirely pale greenish-white, in which case the plant may resemble Cyperus flavescens. Since the color of the scales may be misleading, the styles should also be examined. Cyperus diandrus has persistent styles that project 2–4 mm beyond the tip of the scale, whereas Cyperus bipartitus has deciduous styles that project less than 2 mm.

== Taxonomy ==
Cyperus bipartitus was named and described by the American botanist John Torrey in 1836. Torrey's description was based on a specimen collected in New Orleans, Louisiana. Cyperus bipartitus Torr. has many synonyms but two are most important: Cyperus diandrus var. castaneus (Pursh) Torr. and Cyperus rivularis Kunth.

The taxon known as Cyperus bipartitus was first described as Cyperus flavescens var. castaneus by the German-American botanist Frederick Traugott Pursh in 1813. Pursh's description was based on specimens from New York, Vermont, and Massachusetts. The epithet castaneus, which means "chestnut-brown", refers to the color of the floral scales. In 1824, the American botanist Jacob Bigelow raised Pursh's variety to the rank of species. At the time, Bigelow was unaware that the name Cyperus castaneus had been previously published in 1797, and so Cyperus castaneus (Pursh) Bigelow is an illegitimate name. In 1836, Torrey published the name Cyperus diandrus var. castaneus based on Pursh's variety. In addition to Pursh and Bigelow, Torrey cited Cyperus bicolor, an illegitimate name published by William P. C. Barton in 1818. Torrey noted the variety was commonly found in New England, western New York State, and Pennsylvania, and went on to describe a taxon that "is very distinct from Cyperus diandrus". He elaborated on the differences between the two taxa in his Flora of the State of New York published in 1843.

Torrey simultaneously published the names Cyperus diandrus var. castaneus and Cyperus bipartitus in his monograph of 1836 but he made no connection between the two, nor was the latter included in his Flora of the State of New York in 1843. These facts suggest that the taxon we now call Cyperus bipartitus was known to Torrey (and his contemporaries) as Cyperus diandrus var. castaneus.

In 1837, the German botanist Carl Sigismund Kunth named and described Cyperus rivularis based on a specimen collected in the U.S. state of Georgia. Kunth compared Cyperus rivularis to Cyperus flavescens but he did not mention Cyperus diandrus. Over the next 150 years, many botanists would consider Cyperus diandrus var. castaneus (Pursh) Torr. to be a synonym of Cyperus rivularis Kunth. The controversy ended in 1983 when the name Cyperus rivularis Kunth was firmly placed in synonymy with Cyperus bipartitus Torr. The latter became widely accepted after its publication in the influential Flora of North America in 2002. As of February 2026, most authorities consider both Cyperus diandrus var. castaneus (Pursh) Torr. and Cyperus rivularis Kunth to be synonyms of Cyperus bipartitus Torr.

== Distribution and habitat ==
Cyperus bipartitus is native to the Americas, from southeastern Canada to northern Argentina. It is found in wet environments such as lakes, sandbars, and ditches at elevations to 1,500 metres (4,900 ft). In the United States, its season runs from July to October, but in Mexico, its season extends into January.

North of Mexico, Cyperus bipartitus is most common in the Great Lakes region. It is relatively uncommon in the southeastern United States, being essentially absent from Louisiana eastward along the Gulf Coastal Plain across the Florida panhandle to the Atlantic Coastal Plain of South Carolina. The type specimens of both Cyperus bipartitus Torr. and Cyperus rivularis Kunth came from the southeastern U.S., which partially explains the confusion surrounding the taxonomy of this species. Despite this, one or the other of these names has been in constant use since at least 1894.

== See also ==
- List of Cyperus species
- Glossary of botanical terms

== Bibliography ==
- Britton, N. L. (January 1894). "New or Noteworthy North American Phanerogams-VIII". Bulletin of the Torrey Botanical Club. 21 (1): 27–34. doi:10.2307/2478032.
- Dole, E. J., ed. (1937). The Flora of Vermont (3rd ed.). Burlington, Vermont: Free Press Printing Co.
- Kunth, Carl Sigismund (1837). Enum. Pl. [Kunth] Vol. 2. Stuttgart and Tübingen: J. G. Cottae.
- Mohlenbrock, Robert H. (April 1960). "The Cyperaceae of Illinois. I. Cyperus". The American Midland Naturalist. 63 (2): 270–306. doi:10.2307/2422793.
- Torrey, John (1836). "Monograph of the North American Cyperaceae". Annals of the Lyceum of Natural History of New York. 3: 239–448.
- Torrey, John (1843). Flora of the State of New York. Vol. 2. Albany: Carroll and Cook.
- Tucker, Gordon C. (1983). "The Taxonomy of Cyperus (Cyperaceae) in Costa Rica and Panama". Systematic Botany Monographs. 2: 1–85. doi:10.2307/25027589. JSTOR 25027589.
- Tucker, Gordon C. (1994). "Revision of the Mexican Species of Cyperus (Cyperaceae)". Systematic Botany Monographs. 43: 1–213. doi:10.2307/25027842. JSTOR 25027842.
