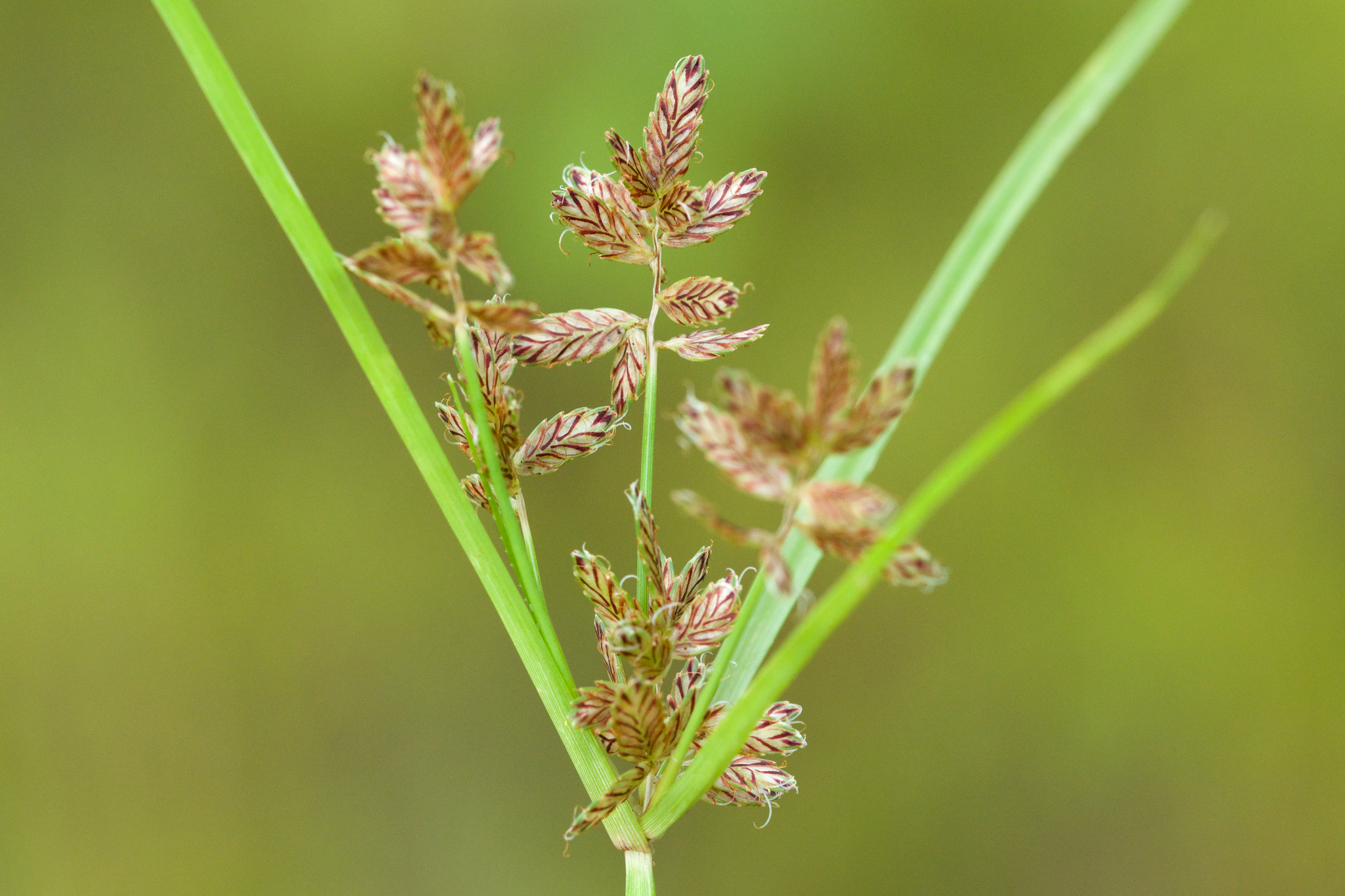
- North shore of Lake Ontario, Canada in August

Conservation status
- Secure (NatureServe)

Scientific classification
- Kingdom: Plantae
- Clade: Tracheophytes
- Clade: Angiosperms
- Clade: Monocots
- Clade: Commelinids
- Order: Poales
- Family: Cyperaceae
- Genus: Cyperus
- Species: C. diandrus

Binomial name
- Cyperus diandrus Torr.

Synonyms
- Homotypic synonyms: Pycreus diandrus (Torr.) C.B.Clarke; Torreya maritima Raf.; Heterotypic synonyms: Cyperus diandrus f. elongatus (Britton) Fernald; Cyperus diandrus var. elongatus Britton; Cyperus diandrus var. pauciflorus Alph.Wood

= Cyperus diandrus =

Species of flowering plant

Cyperus diandrus, also known as umbrella flatsedge, is a species of flowering plant in the sedge family Cyperaceae. It is native to northeastern North America, ranging from the Maritime provinces of southeastern Canada southward to Virginia, reaching as far west as Nebraska. It is often confused with Cyperus bipartitus, both of which have chestnut-brown scales protecting the flowers. Its season runs from July to October but little else is known about its ecology.

Cyperus diandrus was named and described by John Torrey in 1818. The common name refers to the umbrella-like shape of its flower cluster, known to botanists as an umbel. The specific epithet diandrus suggests that each flower has "two stamens" (pollen-bearing organs), which is also true of various other species of flatsedges. In Canada, it is referred to as low umbrella flatsedge (French: souchet diandre). In other locales, it is simply known as low flatsedge.

== Description ==
Cyperus diandrus is an annual sedge with fibrous roots. It has a cespitose (tufted) growth habit, with multiple stems at the base of the plant. A stem rarely exceeds 25 cm (9.8 in) in height. Above the stem, the inflorescence bears clusters of spikelets, each with numerous florets. There are up to 4 leaf-like bracts at the base of the inflorescence. The main cluster of spikelets at the top of the stem is stalkless, accompanied by 0–4 additional clusters on stalks up to 6 cm long. Each cluster supports 6–12 flattened spikelets. The terminal spikelet is usually erect. A spikelet consists of 8–28 florets, each covered by a scale (a type of bract in sedges and grasses). Each floret has two (occasionally three) anthers and a branched style with two stigmas. A perianth is absent. The anthers and stigmas emerge from the axil of the floral scale. The fruit is an achene.

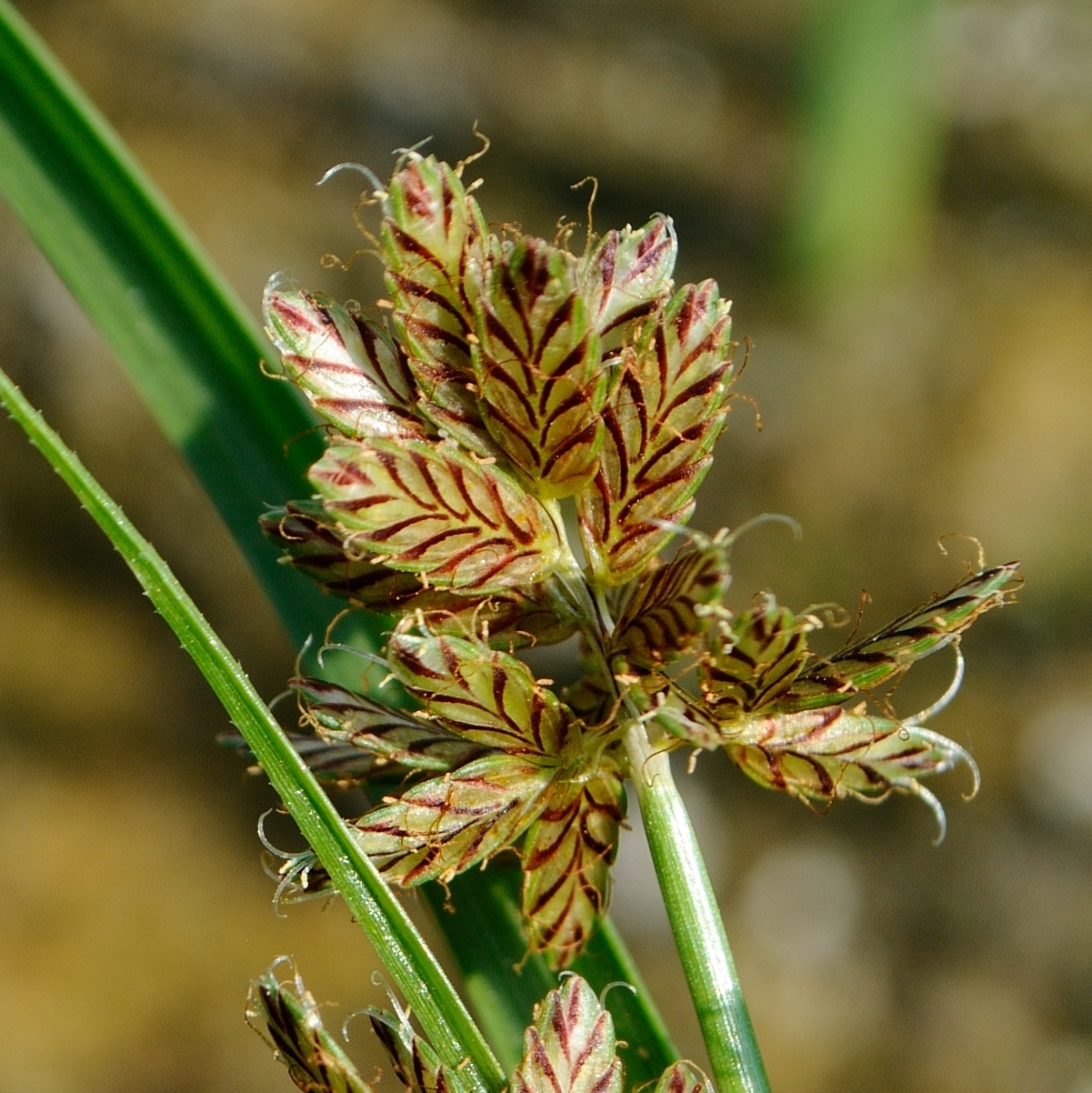
Cluster of spikelets (New York in Sep)

Cyperus diandrus is sometimes confused with Cyperus bipartitus, both of which have pigmented floral scales ranging in color from reddish-brown to purplish-brown. The two species may be distinguished by the pigmented pattern on the surface of the scales. Cyperus diandrus has a thin band of pigment along the scale's margin, with a conspicuous pale area on the face of the scale. Cyperus bipartitus is more heavily pigmented such that a pale area is lacking. Occasionally the scales will be entirely pale greenish-white, in which case the plant may resemble Cyperus flavescens. Since the color of the scales may be misleading, the styles should also be examined. Cyperus diandrus has persistent styles that project 2–4 mm beyond the tip of the scale, whereas Cyperus bipartitus has deciduous styles that project less than 2 mm. The relatively long styles of Cyperus diandrus give its spikelets a woolly appearance.

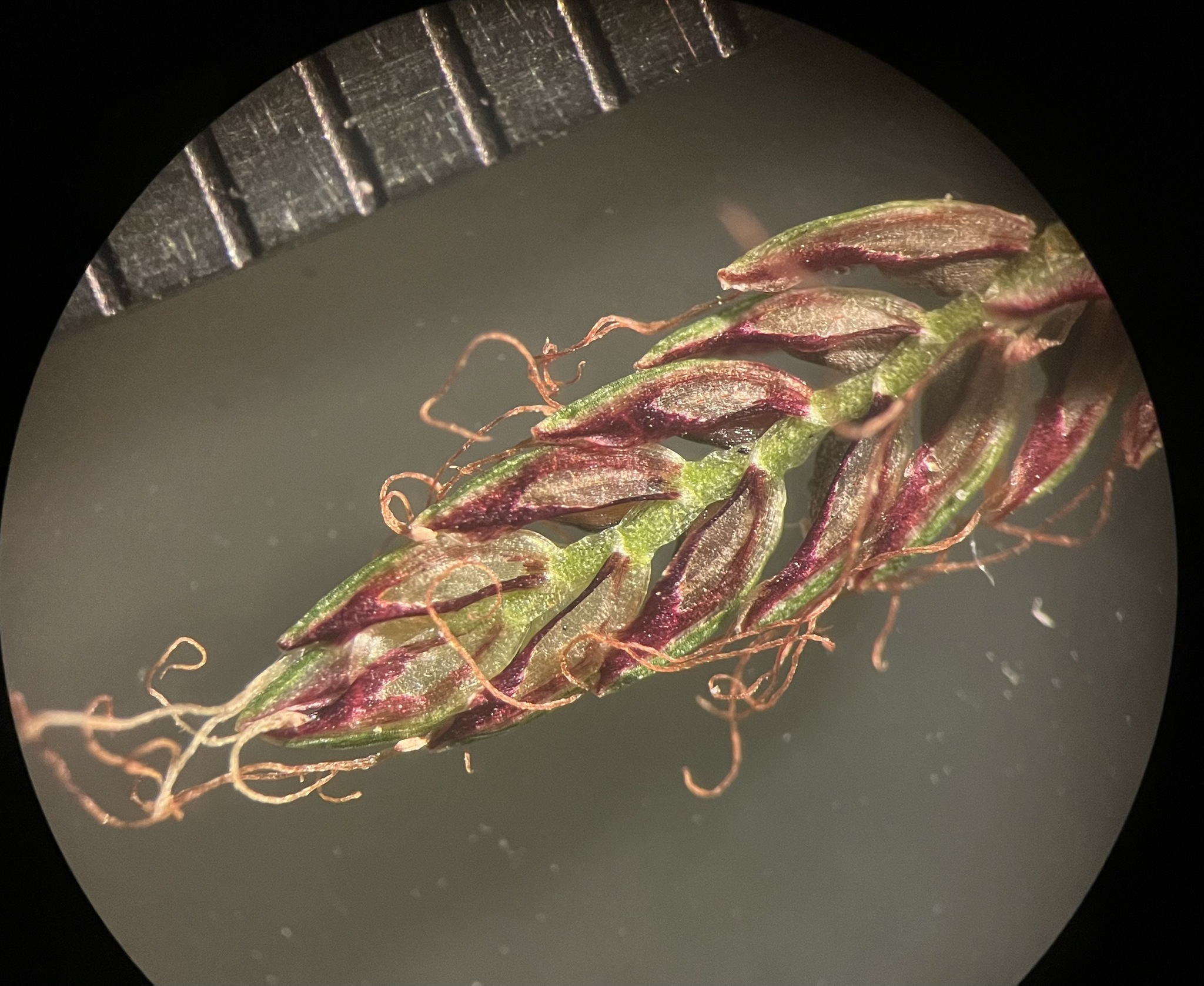
Spikelet with long, persistent styles (Québec in Sep)

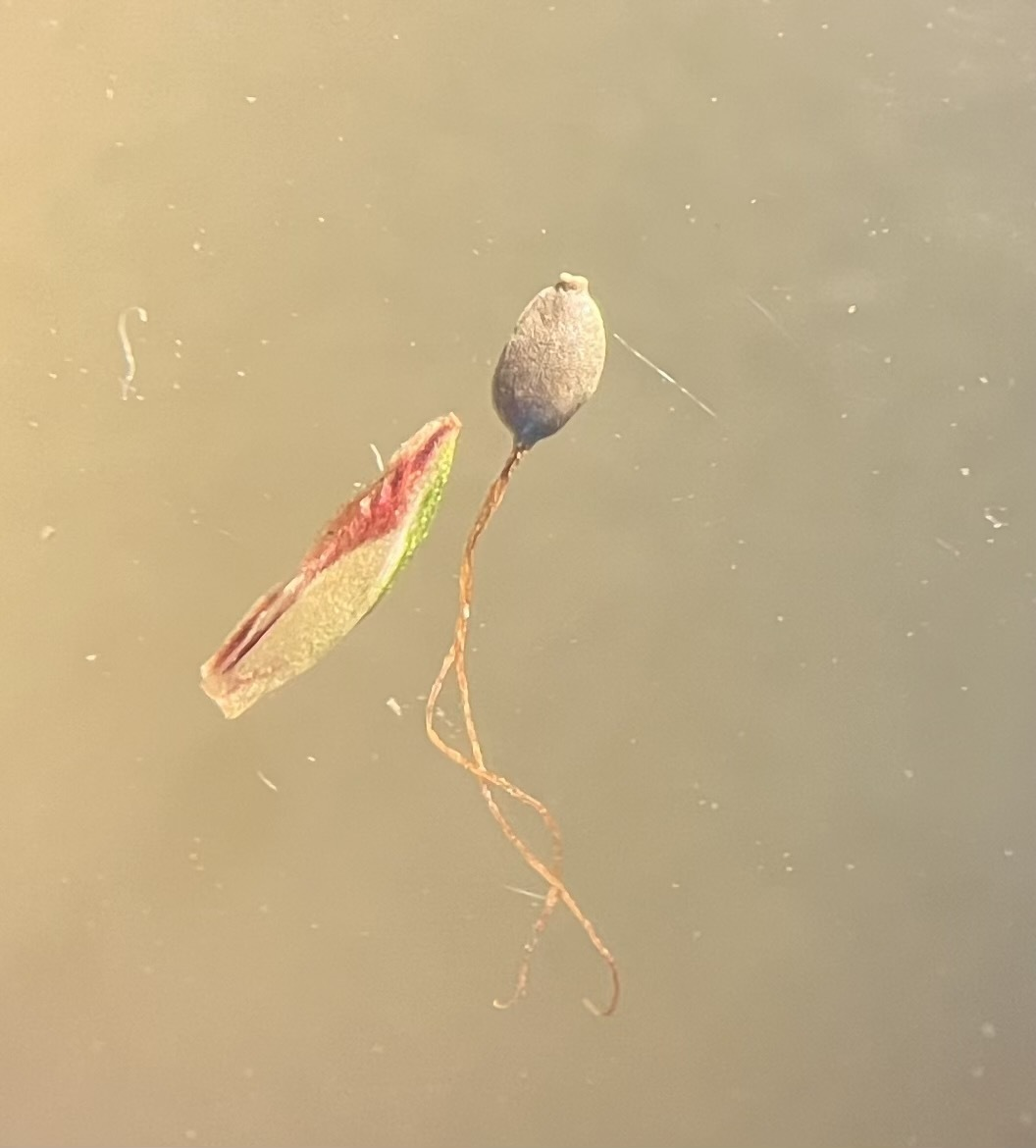
Floret (left) and achene with two-part style more than twice as long

== Taxonomy ==
Cyperus diandrus was first described by the American botanist John Torrey in 1818. Torrey published a more elaborate description of the species (in both Latin and English) in 1819. Its type specimen was collected by the American naturalist John Eatton Le Conte on the border of salt marshes near New York City. The specific epithet diandrus means "with two stamens", a characteristic shared by various species of Cyperus. In 1843, Torrey referred to the species as the "diandrous galingale". In Canada, it is called "low umbrella flatsedge" (French: souchet diandre). In other locales, it is simply known as "low flatsedge" (or "low cyperus").

Cyperus diandrus is closely allied with Cyperus bipartitus. The latter was first described as Cyperus flavescens var. castaneus by the German-American botanist Frederick Traugott Pursh in 1813. In 1836, Torrey published the name Cyperus diandrus var. castaneus based on Pursh's variety. Torrey intentionally described a variety (not a species) but he emphasized that it "is very distinct from Cyperus diandrus". In 1843, Torrey compared the two taxa in detail. Combined with other details, Torrey's descriptions of Cyperus diandrus and Cyperus diandrus var. castaneus may be organized as follows:

	Cyperus diandrus	Cyperus bipartitus (syn. Cyperus diandrus var. castaneus)
Spikelets	Flatly compressed	Less so
Scale shape	Oblong, with obtuse tips	Longer and narrower, very closely imbricated (overlapping)
Scale pigment	Thin band of pigment along the margin, with a conspicuous pale area on the face of the scale	More heavily pigmented such that a pale area is lacking
Scale texture	Membranaceous (thin, pliable)	Coriaceous (leathery), with a firmer texture
Style length	Much exserted beyond the scales (2–4 mm), the exposed portion about as long as the scale; total length three or four times the length of the achene	Scarcely exserted beyond the scales (<2 mm); total length about twice the length of the achene
Style form	2-cleft nearly to the base; more-or-less straight	Less deeply cleft; usually making a short double curvature toward the base
Achenes	Oblong-obovate, slightly scabrous, dull	Orbicular-obovate, minutely wrinkled transversely

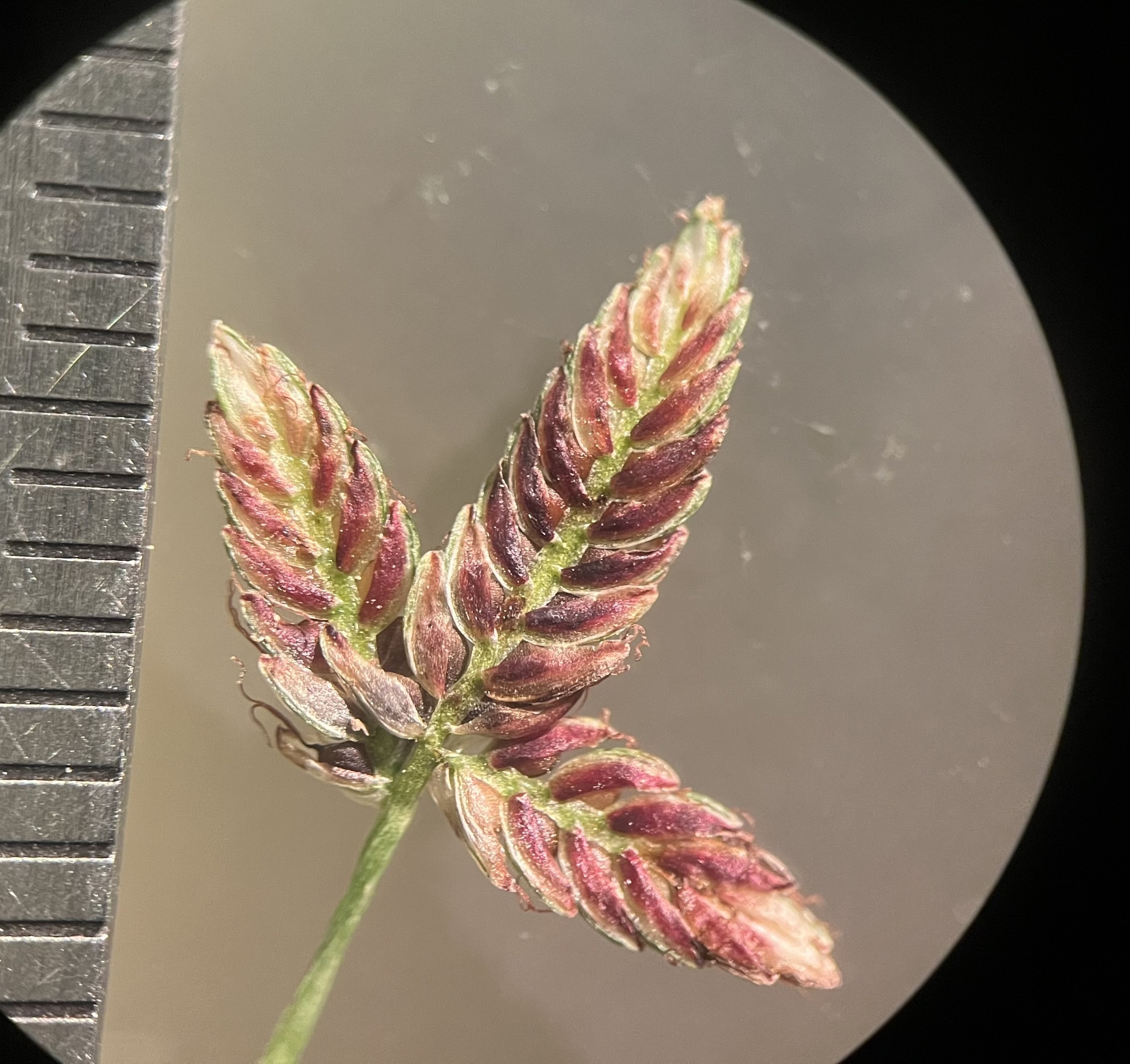
Cyperus bipartitus, spikelets (Québec in Sep)

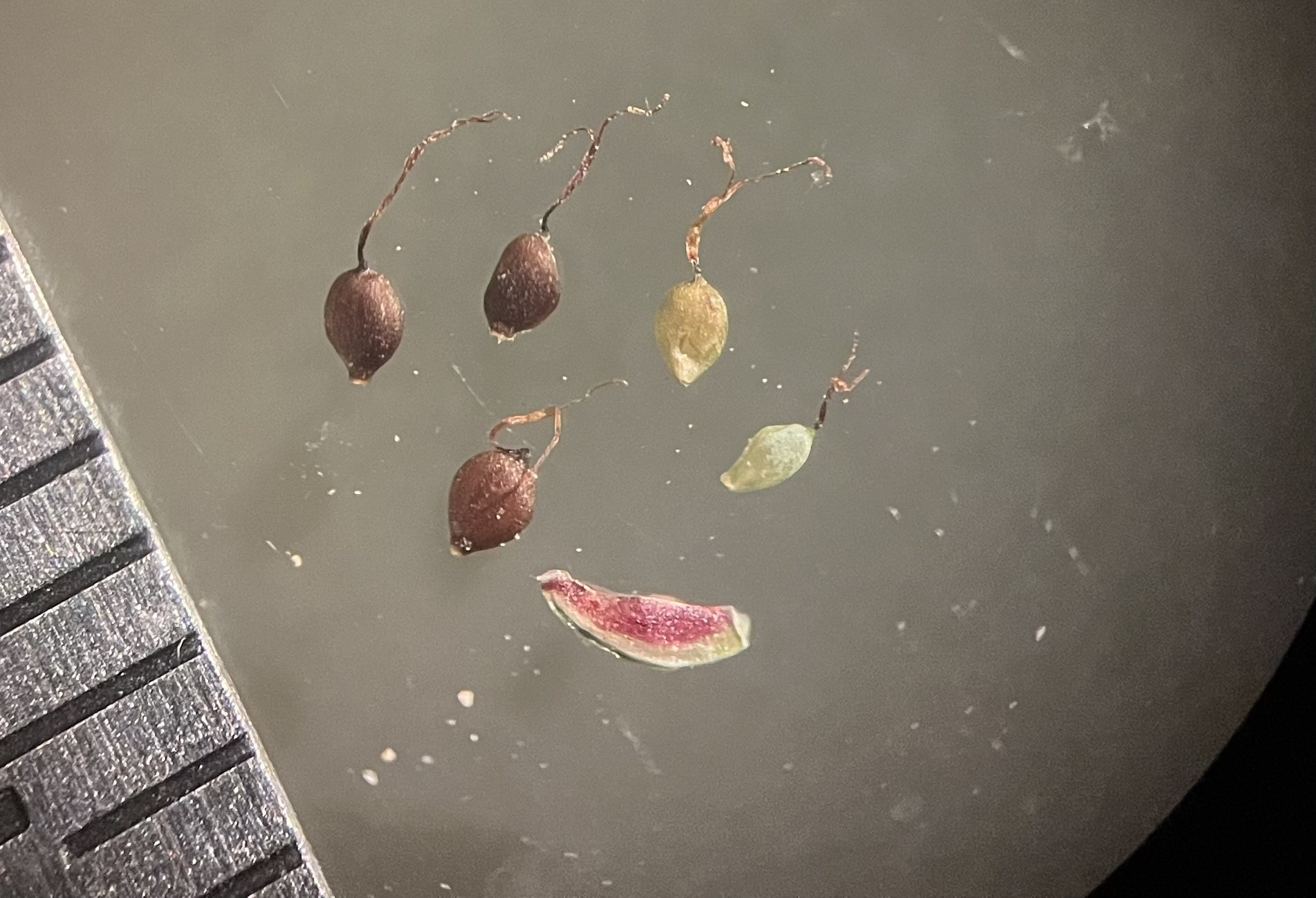
Cyperus bipartitus, floret and achenes with two-part styles less than twice as long

== Distribution and habitat ==
Since Cyperus diandrus is often confused with other species, range maps should be interpreted with care. For example, in 1960, many Illinois specimens labeled as Cyperus diandrus were found to be misidentified. The species was subsequently found to occur in just eight Illinois counties.

Cyperus diandrus is native to northeastern North America, ranging from Nova Scotia southward to Virginia, and as far west as Nebraska. It was introduced in Germany. In 2002, Flora of North America reported Cyperus diandrus in the following provinces and states:

- Canada: New Brunswick, Nova Scotia, Ontario, Quebec
- United States: Connecticut, Delaware, Illinois, Indiana, Iowa, Maine, Maryland, Massachusetts, Michigan, Minnesota, Missouri, Nebraska, New Hampshire, New Jersey, New York, Pennsylvania, Rhode Island, Vermont, Virginia

In the United States, it is especially common in New England, New York, New Jersey, and the Midwestern United States. It was introduced in the U.S. state of Washington. Throughout its range, it grows on shorelines in sandy, peaty and slightly brackish habitats, usually not in disturbed areas. Its season runs from July to October.

== Conservation ==
As of February 2026, the NatureServe global conservation status of Cyperus diandrus is secure (G5). It is uncommon (S3) in Illinois, Iowa, New York, and Quebec; imperiled (S2) in North Dakota, Ohio, and Pennsylvania; critically imperiled (S1) in Delaware, Missouri, New Brunswick, Nova Scotia, Vermont, and Virginia; and possibly extirpated (SH) in Kansas. It is endangered in Pennsylvania and Vermont.

== See also ==
- List of Cyperus species
- Glossary of botanical terms

== Bibliography ==
- Dole, E. J., ed. (1937). The Flora of Vermont (3rd ed.). Burlington, Vermont: Free Press Printing Co.
- Eaton, Amos (1818). A Manual of Botany for the Northern and Middle States (2nd ed.). Albany: Websters and Skinners.
- Gledhill, David (2008). The Names of Plants (4th ed.). Cambridge University Press. ISBN 978-0-521-86645-3.
- Mohlenbrock, Robert H. (April 1960). "The Cyperaceae of Illinois. I. Cyperus". The American Midland Naturalist. 63 (2): 270–306. doi:10.2307/2422793.
- Torrey, John (1819). A catalogue of plants, growing spontaneously within thirty miles of the City of New-York. Albany: Lyceum of Natural History of New York.
- Torrey, John (1836). "Monograph of the North American Cyperaceae". Annals of the Lyceum of Natural History of New York. 3: 239–448.
- Torrey, John (1843). Flora of the State of New York. Vol. 2. Albany: Carroll and Cook.
