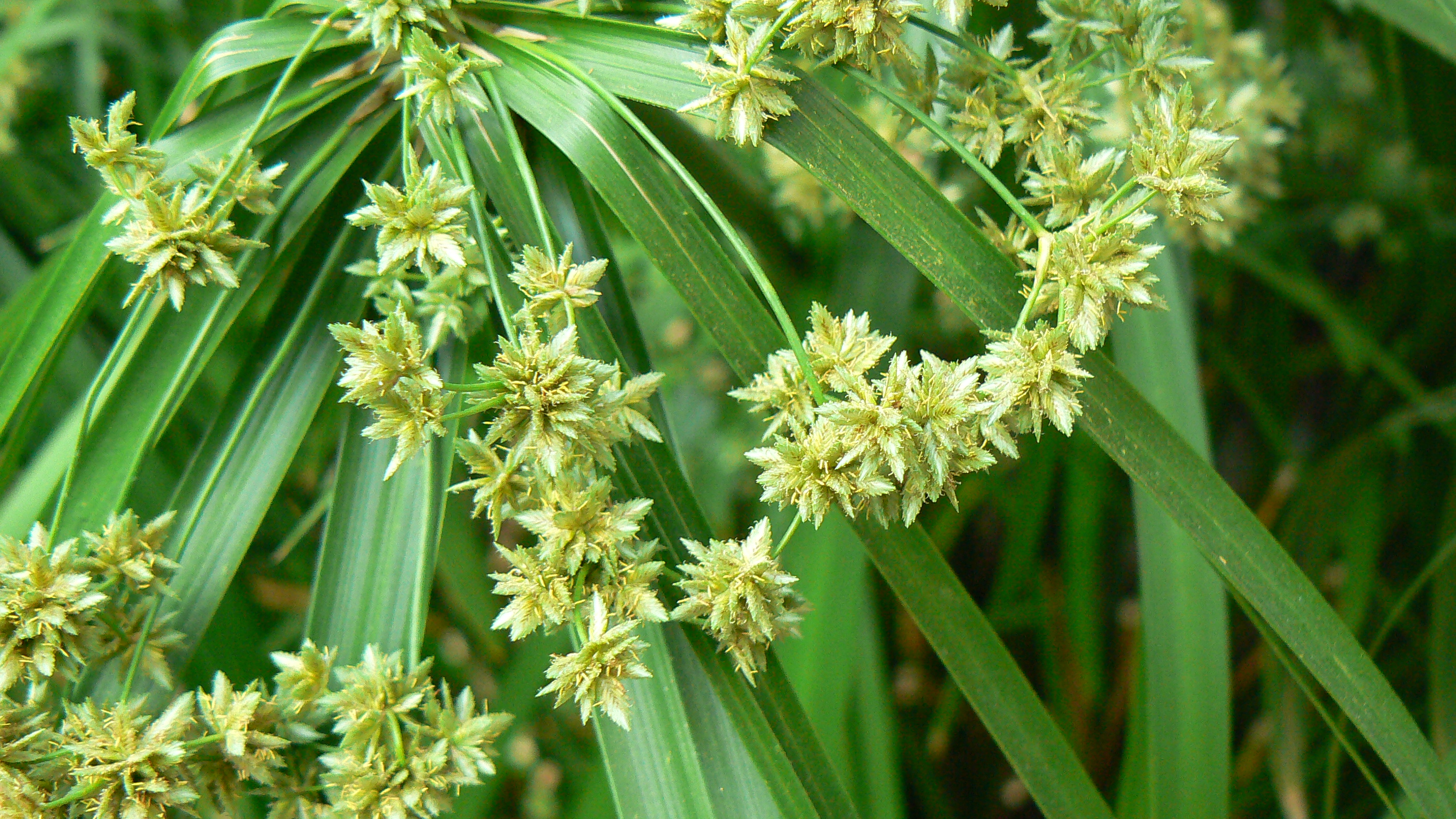
- Cyperus alternifolius

Scientific classification
- Kingdom: Plantae
- Clade: Embryophytes
- Clade: Tracheophytes
- Clade: Spermatophytes
- Clade: Angiosperms
- Clade: Monocots
- Clade: Commelinids
- Order: Poales
- Family: Cyperaceae
- Genus: Cyperus
- Species: C. alterniflorus

Binomial name
- Cyperus alterniflorus R.Br.

= Cyperus alterniflorus =

Umbrella flat-sedge

Species of plant native to Australia

Cyperus alterniflorus is a sedge of the family Cyperaceae that is native to Australia.

The perennial and rhizomatous sedge has a robust tufted or tussock-like habit and typically grows to a height of 0.3 to 2 metres (1.0 to 6.6 ft). The plant blooms between June and October producing yellow-green-brown flowers. The plant has a short thick rhizome with triquetrous, smooth to scabrous culms that are 0.4 to 1.4 m (1.3 to 4.6 ft) long with a diameter of 5 centimetres (2.0 in). Leaves are usually longer than the culms and are strongly septate to nodulose and around 12 millimetres (0.47 in) wide. The compound to decompound inflorescence has three to eight primary branches up to 15 centimetres (5.9 in) in length in dense clusters. Following flowering it will form a trigonous pale red-brown to dark brown nut. The nut is narrow-ellipsoid in shape with a length of 1.6 to 2.3 millimetres (0.06 to 0.09 in) and a diameter of 0.5 to 0.7 mm (0.020 to 0.028 in).

In Western Australia it is found around creeks and swamps in the Mid West, Wheatbelt and Goldfields–Esperance regions where it grows in sandy-clay soils. It is also found in inland areas of New South Wales, Queensland and South Australia.

== See also ==
- List of Cyperus species
