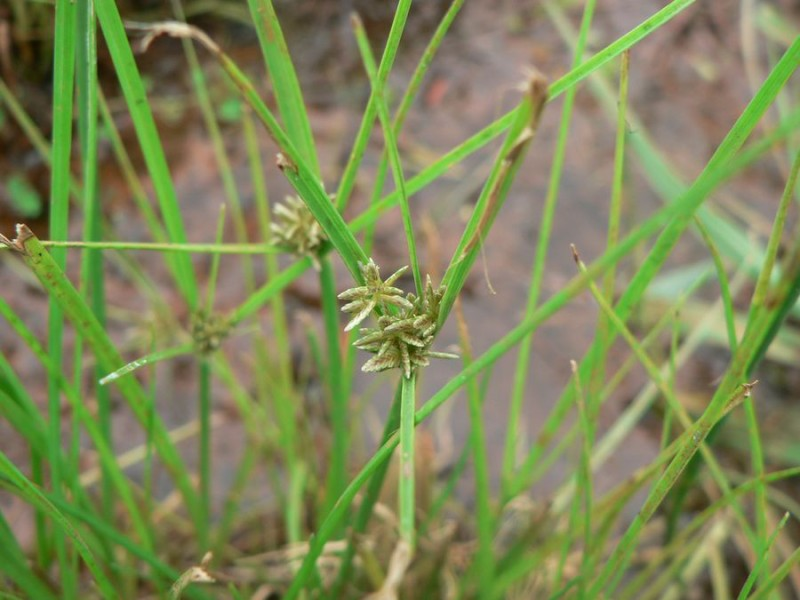

Conservation status
- Least Concern (IUCN 3.1)

Scientific classification
- Kingdom: Plantae
- Clade: Tracheophytes
- Clade: Angiosperms
- Clade: Monocots
- Clade: Commelinids
- Order: Poales
- Family: Cyperaceae
- Genus: Cyperus
- Species: C. flavescens

Binomial name
- Cyperus flavescens L.

Synonyms
- Homotypic synonyms: Chlorocyperus flavescens (L.) Rikli; Distimus flavescens (L.) Raf.; Pycreus flavescens (L.) P.Beauv. ex Rchb.; Heterotypic synonyms: Chlorocyperus abyssinicus (Hochst. ex A.Rich.) Rikli; Chlorocyperus intermedius Rikli; Cyperus abyssinicus Hochst. ex A.Rich.; Cyperus durandii Boeckeler; Cyperus eragrostis C.Krauss; Cyperus fallaciosus (Cherm.) Raymond; Cyperus flavens Pall.; Cyperus flavescens var. abyssinicus (Hochst. ex A.Rich.) C.B.Clarke; Cyperus flavescens f. abyssinicus (Hochst. ex A.Rich.) Kük.; Cyperus flavescens var. castaneus (Lye) Lye; Cyperus flavescens f. caucasicus K.Koch; Cyperus flavescens f. compactus Asch. & Graebn.; Cyperus flavescens subsp. fallaciosus (Cherm.) Lye; Cyperus flavescens f. fontanesii (Kunth) Kük.; Cyperus flavescens var. fontanesii (Kunth) C.B.Clarke; Cyperus flavescens f. gracillimus Asch. & Graebn.; Cyperus flavescens var. gussonei (Gasp. ex Guss.) Nyman; Cyperus flavescens subsp. intermedius (Rikli) Lye; Cyperus flavescens f. major Lojac.; Cyperus flavescens subsp. microglumis (Lye) Lye; Cyperus flavescens var. minor Gaudin; Cyperus flavescens subvar. mohrii Farw.; Cyperus flavescens f. monostachyus Sacc.; Cyperus flavescens f. paraensis (Nees) Kük.; Cyperus flavescens var. paraensis (Nees) Boeckeler; Cyperus flavescens var. piceus (Liebm.) Fernald; Cyperus flavescens var. poiformis (Pursh) Fernald; Cyperus flavescens var. pygmaeus Goiran; Cyperus flavescens var. rehmannianus (C.B.Clarke) Kük. (incomplete list)

= Cyperus flavescens =

Species of sedge

Cyperus flavescens, commonly known as the yellow flatsedge, is a species of flowering plant belonging to the family Cyperaceae.

== Taxonomy ==
Cyperus flavescens was first described by the Swedish botanist Carl Linnaeus in 1753. Linnaeus based his diagnosis on specimens collected in marshes in Germany, Switzerland, and France ("habitat in Germaniae, Helvetiae, Galliae paludosis").

== Distribution and habitat ==
Cyperus flavescens has a cosmopolitan distribution. It is native to North America, South America, Europe, Asia, and Africa. It was introduced to New South Wales and Queensland in Australia. In North America (north of Mexico), it is most common in the eastern United States.

== See also ==
- List of Cyperus species
- Glossary of botanical terms

== Bibliography ==
- Linnaeus, Carl (1753). Species Plantarum: exhibentes plantas rite cognitas, ad genera relatas, cum differentiis specificis, nominibus trivialibus, synonymis selectis, locis natalibus, secundum systema sexuale digestas (1st ed.). Stockholm: Impensis Laurentii Salvii.
