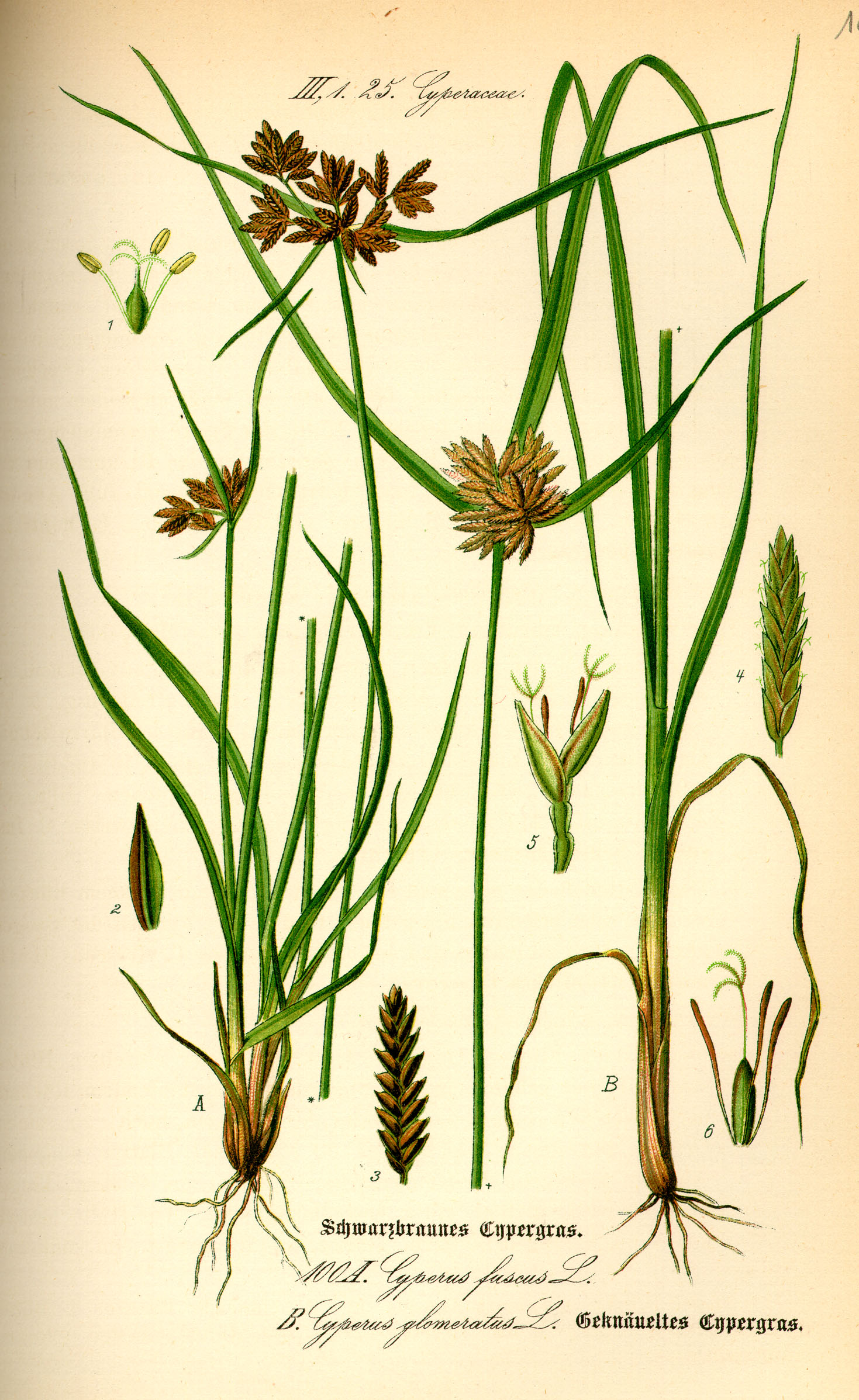

Scientific classification
- Kingdom: Plantae
- Clade: Tracheophytes
- Clade: Angiosperms
- Clade: Monocots
- Clade: Commelinids
- Order: Poales
- Family: Cyperaceae
- Genus: Cyperus
- Species: C. glomeratus

Binomial name
- Cyperus glomeratus L., 1756

= Cyperus glomeratus =

Clustered Flatsedge

Species of sedge

Cyperus glomeratus, the clustered flatsedge_{,} is a species of sedge that is native to parts of Europe and Asia. It grows in rice fields and shores of rivers. It is also in the United States, and one was even found in the British Indian Ocean Territory.

== See also ==
- List of Cyperus species
