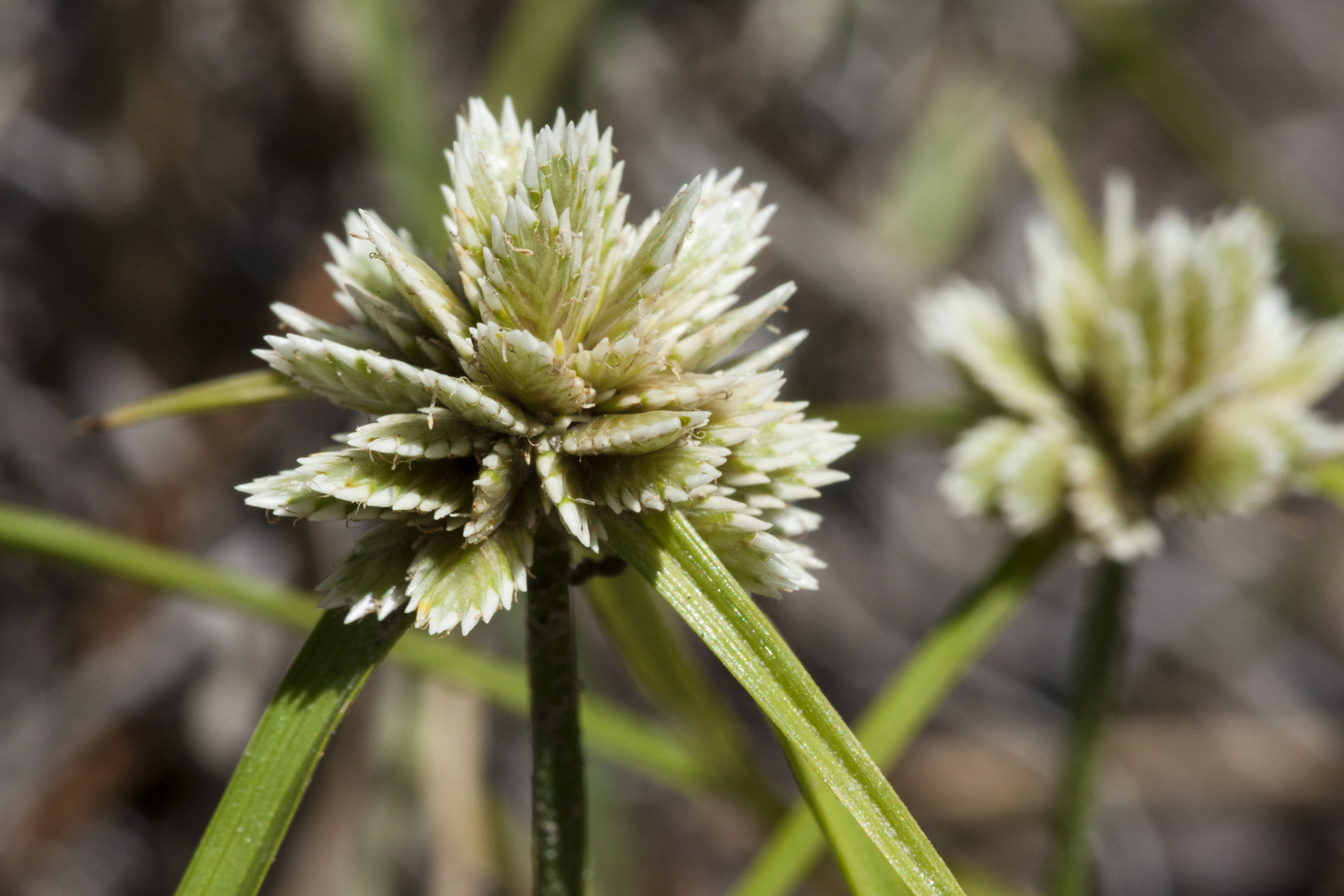

Scientific classification
- Kingdom: Plantae
- Clade: Tracheophytes
- Clade: Angiosperms
- Clade: Monocots
- Clade: Commelinids
- Order: Poales
- Family: Cyperaceae
- Genus: Cyperus
- Species: C. seslerioides

Binomial name
- Cyperus seslerioides Kunth

= Cyperus seslerioides =

Species of plant native to the Americas

Cyperus seslerioides is a species of sedge that is native to southern parts of North America, Central America and parts of South America.

The species was first formally described by the botanist Carl Sigismund Kunth in 1816.

== See also ==
- List of Cyperus species
