= Cyperus mitis =

Scientific classification
- Kingdom: Plantae
- Clade: Tracheophytes
- Clade: Angiosperms
- Clade: Monocots
- Clade: Commelinids
- Order: Poales
- Family: Cyperaceae
- Genus: Cyperus
- Species: C. mitis

Binomial name
- Cyperus mitis Steud.

Species of plant native to Asia

Cyperus mitis is a species of sedge that is native to Asia between India in the west to China in the east.

The species was first formally described by the botanist Ernst Gottlieb von Steudel in 1855.

== See also ==
- List of Cyperus species
