= Cyperus oxylepis =

Scientific classification
- Kingdom: Plantae
- Clade: Tracheophytes
- Clade: Angiosperms
- Clade: Monocots
- Clade: Commelinids
- Order: Poales
- Family: Cyperaceae
- Genus: Cyperus
- Species: C. oxylepis

Binomial name
- Cyperus oxylepis Nees ex Steud. 1853

Species of sedge

Cyperus oxylepis is a species of sedge that is native to southern parts of North America, Central America and South America.

== See also ==
- List of Cyperus species
