= Cyperus lateriticus =

Scientific classification
- Kingdom: Plantae
- Clade: Tracheophytes
- Clade: Angiosperms
- Clade: Monocots
- Clade: Commelinids
- Order: Poales
- Family: Cyperaceae
- Genus: Cyperus
- Species: C. lateriticus

Binomial name
- Cyperus lateriticus J.Raynal, 1966

Species of sedge

Cyperus lateriticus is a species of sedge that is native to parts of the west coast of Africa.

== See also ==
- List of Cyperus species
