= Cyperus perennis =

Scientific classification
- Kingdom: Plantae
- Clade: Tracheophytes
- Clade: Angiosperms
- Clade: Monocots
- Clade: Commelinids
- Order: Poales
- Family: Cyperaceae
- Genus: Cyperus
- Species: C. perennis

Binomial name
- Cyperus perennis (M.E.Jones) O'Neill, 1945

Species of sedge

Cyperus perennis is a species of sedge that is native to north western parts of Mexico.

== See also ==
- List of Cyperus species
