= List of Poales of South Africa =

Flowering plants in the order Poales recorded from South Africa

Poales is an order of flowering plants in the monocotyledons, and includes families of plants such as the grasses, bromeliads, and sedges. Sixteen families are currently recognized to be part of Poales. The flowers are typically small, enclosed by bracts, and arranged in inflorescences The flowers of many species are wind pollinated, and the seeds usually contain starch.

23,420 species of vascular plant have been recorded in South Africa, making it the sixth most species-rich country in the world and the most species-rich country on the African continent. Of these, 153 species are considered to be threatened. Nine biomes have been described in South Africa: Fynbos, Succulent Karoo, desert, Nama Karoo, grassland, savanna, Albany thickets, the Indian Ocean coastal belt, and forests.

The 2018 South African National Biodiversity Institute's National Biodiversity Assessment plant checklist lists 35,130 taxa in the phyla Anthocerotophyta (hornworts (6)), Anthophyta (flowering plants (33534)), Bryophyta (mosses (685)), Cycadophyta (cycads (42)), Lycopodiophyta (Lycophytes(45)), Marchantiophyta (liverworts (376)), Pinophyta (conifers (33)), and Pteridophyta (cryptogams (408)).

10 families are represented in the literature. Listed taxa include species, subspecies, varieties, and forms as recorded, some of which have subsequently been allocated to other taxa as synonyms, in which cases the accepted taxon is appended to the listing. Multiple entries under alternative names reflect taxonomic revision over time.

== Bromeliaceae ==
Family: Bromeliaceae,

=== Tillandsia ===
Genus Tillandsia:

- Tillandsia juncea (Ruiz & Pav.) Poir. not indigenous, cultivated, naturalised

== Cyperaceae ==
Family: Cyperaceae,

=== Abildgaardia ===
Genus Abildgaardia:

- Abildgaardia filamentosa (Vahl) Lye var. holubii (C.B.Clarke) Lye, accepted as Bulbostylis scabricaulis Cherm.
- Abildgaardia hygrophila (Gordon-Gray) Lye, indigenous
- Abildgaardia ovata (Burm.f.) Kral, indigenous
- Abildgaardia triflora (L.) Abeyw. indigenous
- Abildgaardia variegata (Gordon-Gray) Lye, accepted as Fimbristylis variegata Gordon-Gray, present

=== Afroscirpoides ===
Genus Afroscirpoides:

- Afroscirpoides dioeca (Kunth) Garcia-Madr. indigenous

=== Alinula ===
Genus Alinula:

- Alinula paradoxa (Cherm.) Goetgh. & Vorster, indigenous

=== Archaeocarex ===
Genus Archaeocarex:

- Archaeocarex ecklonii (Nees) Pissjauk. accepted as Carex capensis Thunb. indigenous
- Archaeocarex kunthiana (Kuk.) Pissjauk. accepted as Carex spartea Wahlenb. indigenous
- Archaeocarex rufus (Nees) Fedde & J.Schust. accepted as Carex ludwigii (Hochst.) Luceno & Martin-Bravo, indigenous
- Archaeocarex spartea (Wahlenb.) Pissjauk. accepted as Carex spartea Wahlenb. indigenous
- Archaeocarex thunbergii (Nees) Pissjauk. accepted as Carex capensis Thunb. endemic

=== Ascolepis ===
Genus Ascolepis:

- Ascolepis capensis (Kunth) Ridl. indigenous

=== Asterochaete ===
Genus Asterochaete:

- Asterochaete glomerata Nees, accepted as Carpha glomerata (Thunb.) Nees

=== Bolboschoenus ===
Genus Bolboschoenus:

- Bolboschoenus glaucus (Lam.) S.G.Sm. indigenous
- Bolboschoenus maritimus (L.) Palla, indigenous

=== Bulbostylis ===
Genus Bulbostylis:

- Bulbostylis boeckeleriana (Schweinf.) Beetle, indigenous
- Bulbostylis burchellii (Ficalho & Hiern) C.B.Clarke, indigenous
- Bulbostylis contexta (Nees) M.Bodard, indigenous
- Bulbostylis densa (Wall.) Hand.-Mazz. indigenous
  - Bulbostylis densa (Wall.) Hand.-Mazz. subsp. afromontana (Lye) R.W.Haines, indigenous
- Bulbostylis filamentosa (Vahl) C.B.Clarke, indigenous
- Bulbostylis hispidula (Vahl) R.W.Haines, indigenous
  - Bulbostylis hispidula (Vahl) R.W.Haines subsp. pyriformis (Lye) R.W.Haines, indigenous
- Bulbostylis humilis (Kunth) C.B.Clarke, indigenous
- Bulbostylis oritrephes (Ridl.) C.B.Clarke, indigenous
  - Bulbostylis oritrephes(Ridl.) C.B.Clarke subsp. australis B.L.Burtt, accepted as Bulbostylis oritrephes (Ridl.) C.B.Clarke, present
- Bulbostylis parvinux C.B.Clarke, indigenous
- Bulbostylis pusilla (Hochst. ex A.Rich.) C.B.Clarke, indigenous
- Bulbostylis scabricaulis Cherm. indigenous
- Bulbostylis schlechteri C.B.Clarke, endemic
- Bulbostylis schoenoides (Kunth) C.B.Clarke, indigenous
- Bulbostylis scleropus C.B.Clarke, indigenous

=== Capeobolus ===
Genus Capeobolus:

- Capeobolus brevicaulis (C.B.Clarke) Browning, endemic

=== Carex ===
Genus Carex:

- Carex acocksii C.Archer, endemic
- Carex acutiformis Ehrh. not indigenous, naturalised
- Carex aethiopica Schkuhr, endemic
- Carex austro-africana (Kuk.) Raymond, accepted as Carex rhodesiaca Nelmes, indigenous
- Carex basutorum (Turrill) Luceno & Martin-Bravo, indigenous
- Carex bisexualis C.B.Clarke, accepted as Carex capensis Thunb. indigenous
- Carex bolusii C.B.Clarke, accepted as Carex spartea Wahlenb. indigenous
- Carex buchananii (C.B.Clarke ex C.B.Clarke) C.B.Clarke, accepted as Carex kukkoneniana Luceno & Martin-Bravo, indigenous
- Carex burchelliana Boeck. endemic
- Carex burkei (C.B.Clarke) Luceno & Martin-Bravo, indigenous
- Carex capensis Schkuhr [1], accepted as Carex capensis Thunb. indigenous
- Carex capensis Thunb. endemic
- Carex cernua Boott var. austro-africana Kuk. accepted as Carex rhodesiaca Nelmes
- Carex clavata Thunb. endemic
- Carex cognata Kunth, indigenous
  - Carex cognata Kunth var. drakensbergensis (C.B.Clarke) Kuk. accepted as Carex cognata Kunth, present
- Carex condensata C.B.Clarke, accepted as Carex zuluensis C.B.Clarke
- Carex consanguinea Kunth, accepted as Carex divisa Huds.
- Carex densenervosa Chiov. accepted as Carex schimperiana Boeck. indigenous
- Carex distincta (Kukkonen) Luceno & Martin-Bravo, indigenous
- Carex divisa Huds. not indigenous, naturalised
- Carex drakensbergensis C.B.Clarke, accepted as Carex cognata Kunth
- Carex dregeana Kunth, accepted as Carex spartea Wahlenb. indigenous
  - Carex dregeana Kunth var. major C.B.Clarke, accepted as Carex spartea Wahlenb. indigenous
- Carex ecklonii Nees, endemic
- Carex esenbeckiana Boeck. accepted as Carex spartea Wahlenb. indigenous
  - Carex esenbeckiana Boeck. var. elongata Boeck. accepted as Carex spartea Wahlenb. indigenous
- Carex glomerabilis V.I.Krecz. indigenous
- Carex glomerata Thunb. accepted as Carex glomerabilis V.I.Krecz.
- Carex huttoniana Kuk. accepted as Carex zuluensis C.B.Clarke
- Carex indica Schkuhr, accepted as Carex spartea Wahlenb. indigenous
- Carex killickii Nelmes, indigenous
- Carex kukkoneniana Luceno & Martin-Bravo, indigenous
- Carex lancea (Thunb.) Baill. endemic
- Carex leporina L. not indigenous, naturalised
- Carex leribensis Nelmes, accepted as Carex glomerabilis V.I.Krecz. present
- Carex ludwigii (Hochst.) Luceno & Martin-Bravo, indigenous
- Carex merxmuelleri Podlech, accepted as Carex zuluensis C.B.Clarke, present
- Carex monotropa Nelmes, indigenous
- Carex mossii Nelmes, endemic
- Carex multispiculata Luceno & Martin-Bravo, indigenous
- Carex ovalis Gooden., a nom. illeg. synonym; see Carex leporina, above
- Carex ovata Burm.f. accepted as Abildgaardia ovata (Burm.f.) Kral
- Carex perdensa (Kukkonen) Luceno & Martin-Bravo, endemic
- Carex pseudorufa Luceno & Martin-Bravo, endemic
- Carex pubescens Poir. accepted as Fuirena pubescens (Poir.) Kunth var. pubescens
- Carex rainbowii Luceno et al. indigenous
- Carex ramosa Nees, accepted as Carex lancea (Thunb.) Baill. indigenous
- Carex rhodesiaca Nelmes, indigenous
- Carex rufa (Nees) Baill. accepted as Carex ludwigii (Hochst.) Luceno & Martin-Bravo, indigenous
- Carex schimperiana Boeck. indigenous
- Carex schlechteri Nelmes, accepted as Carex glomerabilis V.I.Krecz. present
- Carex schweickerdtii (Merxm. & Podlech) Luceno & Martin-Bravo, endemic
- Carex spartea Wahlenb. indigenous
- Carex spicatopaniculata Boeck. ex C.B.Clarke, indigenous
- Carex sprengelii (Nees) Boeck. accepted as Carex spartea Wahlenb. indigenous
- Carex subinflata Nelmes, indigenous
- Carex sylvatica Huds. [1], not indigenous, naturalised
- Carex uhligii K.Schum. ex C.B.Clarke, indigenous
- Carex wahlenbergiana C.B.Clarke, accepted as Carex zuluensis C.B.Clarke
- Carex zeyheri C.B.Clarke, accepted as Carex capensis Thunb. indigenous
- Carex zuluensis C.B.Clarke, indigenous

=== Carpha ===
Genus Carpha:

- Carpha bracteosa C.B.Clarke, endemic
- Carpha capitellata (Nees) Boeck. indigenous
- Carpha filifolia C.Reid & T.H.Arnold, indigenous
- Carpha glomerata (Thunb.) Nees, endemic
- Carpha schlechteri C.B.Clarke, endemic

=== Chrysitrix ===
Genus Chrysitrix:

  - Chrysitrix capensis L. var. capensis, endemic
  - Chrysitrix capensis L. var. subteres C.B.Clarke, endemic
- Chrysitrix dodii C.B.Clarke, endemic
- Chrysitrix junciformis Nees, endemic

=== Cladium ===
Genus Cladium:

- Cladium mariscus (L.) Pohl, indigenous
  - Cladium mariscus (L.) Pohl subsp. jamaicense (Crantz) Kuk. indigenous

=== Coleochloa ===
Genus Coleochloa:

- Coleochloa pallidior Nelmes, indigenous
- Coleochloa setifera (Ridl.) Gilly, indigenous

=== Costularia ===
Genus Costularia:

- Costularia brevicaulis C.B.Clarke, accepted as Capeobolus brevicaulis (C.B.Clarke) Browning, present
- Costularia natalensis C.B.Clarke, indigenous

=== Courtoisia ===
Genus Courtoisia:

- Courtoisia assimilis (Steud.) C.B.Clarke, accepted as Cyperus assimilis Steud. indigenous
- Courtoisia assimilis (Steud.) Maquet [1], accepted as Cyperus assimilis Steud. indigenous
- Courtoisia cyperoides (Roxb.) Nees, accepted as Cyperus pseudokyllingioides Kuk. indigenous
- Courtoisia cyperoides (Roxb.) Sojak [1], indigenous
- Courtoisina assimilis (Steud.) Maquet, accepted as Cyperus assimilis Steud. indigenous
- Courtoisina cyperoides (Roxb.) Sojak, accepted as Cyperus pseudokyllingioides Kuk. indigenous
  - Courtoisina cyperoides (Roxb.) Sojak subsp. africanus (C.B.Clarke ex Kuk.) Vorster, accepted as Cyperus pseudokyllingioides Kuk. indigenous

=== Cyathocoma ===
Genus Cyathocoma:

- Cyathocoma bachmannii (Kuk.) C.Archer, endemic
- Cyathocoma ecklonii Nees, endemic
- Cyathocoma hexandra (Nees) Browning, endemic

=== Cyperus ===
Genus Cyperus:

- Cyperus albiceps Ridl. accepted as Kyllinga albiceps (Ridl.) Rendle
- Cyperus albostriatus Schrad. indigenous
- Cyperus alopecuroides Rottb. indigenous
- Cyperus alternifolius L. subsp. flabelliformis (Rottb.) Kuk. accepted as Cyperus involucratus Rottb.
- Cyperus amabilis Vahl, indigenous
  - Cyperus amabilis Vahl var. subacaulis Kuk. accepted as Cyperus amabilis Vahl
- Cyperus amnicola Kunth, accepted as Cyperus rupestris Kunth var. amnicola (Kunth) Kuk.
- Cyperus angolensis Boeck. indigenous
- Cyperus aristatus Rottb. accepted as Cyperus squarrosus L.
  - Cyperus aristatus Rottb. var. atriceps Kuk. accepted as Cyperus atriceps (Kuk.) C.Archer & Goetgh. present
- Cyperus articulatus L. indigenous
- Cyperus assimilis Steud. indigenous
- Cyperus atribulbus Kuk. accepted as Pycreus atribulbus (Kuk.) Napper
- Cyperus atriceps (Kuk.) C.Archer & Goetgh. indigenous
- Cyperus auricomus Sieber ex Spreng. accepted as Cyperus digitatus Roxb. subsp. auricomus (Sieber ex Spreng.) Kuk.
- Cyperus austro-africanus C.Archer & Goetgh. indigenous
- Cyperus bellus Kunth, indigenous
- Cyperus betschuanus Boeck. accepted as Pycreus betschuanus (Boeck.) C.B.Clarke
- Cyperus blepharoleptos Steud. indigenous
- Cyperus brevis Boeck. indigenous
- Cyperus brunneo-vaginatus Boeck. accepted as Cyperus marginatus Thunb.
- Cyperus bullatus Kuk. accepted as Cyperus chersinus (N.E.Br.) Kuk.
- Cyperus capensis (Steud.) Endl. endemic
  - Cyperus capensis (Steud.) Endl. var. pseudomarlothii Kuk. forma globospica, accepted as Cyperus uitenhagensis (Steud.) C.Archer & Goetgh.
  - Cyperus capensis (Steud.) Engl. var. pseudomarlothii Kuk. accepted as Cyperus uitenhagensis (Steud.) C.Archer & Goetgh.
- Cyperus chersinus (N.E.Br.) Kuk. indigenous
- Cyperus chrysanthus Boeck. accepted as Pycreus chrysanthus (Boeck.) C.B.Clarke
- Cyperus compactus Lam. accepted as Cyperus obtusiflorus Vahl var. obtusiflorus
- Cyperus compressus L. indigenous
- Cyperus congestus Vahl, indigenous
  - Cyperus congestus Vahl var. brevis (Boeck.) Kuk. accepted as Cyperus brevis Boeck.
  - Cyperus congestus Vahl var. glanduliferus (C.B.Clarke) Kuk. accepted as Cyperus congestus Vahl
  - Cyperus congestus Vahl var. grandiceps Kuk. accepted as Cyperus congestus Vahl
  - Cyperus congestus Vahl var. pseudonatalensis Kuk. accepted as Cyperus congestus Vahl
- Cyperus cooperi (C.B.Clarke) K.Schum. accepted as Cyperus congestus Vahl
- Cyperus crassipes Vahl, indigenous
- Cyperus crinitus Poir. accepted as Ficinia crinita (Poir.) B.L.Burtt
- Cyperus cuspidatus Kunth, indigenous
- Cyperus cyperoides (L.) Kuntze, indigenous
  - Cyperus cyperoides (L.) Kuntze subsp. cyperoides, indigenous
  - Cyperus cyperoides (L.) Kuntze subsp. flavus Lye, indigenous
  - Cyperus cyperoides (L.) Kuntze subsp. pseudoflavus (Kuk.) Lye, indigenous
- Cyperus deciduus Boeck. indigenous
- Cyperus decurvatus (C.B.Clarke) C.Archer & Goetgh. indigenous
- Cyperus denudatus L.f. indigenous
  - Cyperus denudatus L.f. var. sphaerospermus (Schrad.) Kuk. accepted as Cyperus sphaerospermus Schrad.
- Cyperus dichrostachyus Hochst. ex A.Rich. indigenous
- Cyperus difformis L. indigenous
- Cyperus digitatus Roxb. indigenous
- Cyperus digitatus Roxb. subsp. auricomus (Sieber ex Spreng.) Kuk. indigenous
- Cyperus distans L.f. indigenous
  - Cyperus distans L.f. var. niger C.B.Clarke, accepted as Cyperus keniensis Kuk.
- Cyperus dives Delile, indigenous
- Cyperus dubius Rottb. indigenous
  - Cyperus dubius Rottb. var. dubius, indigenous
- Cyperus durus Kunth, endemic
- Cyperus elegantulus Steud. accepted as Pycreus niger (Ruiz & Pav.) Cufod. subsp. elegantulus (Steud.) Lye
- Cyperus elephantinus (C.B.Clarke) Kuk. endemic
- Cyperus emarginatus Schrad. accepted as Cyperus longus L. var. tenuiflorus (Rottb.) Boeck. present
- Cyperus eragrostis Lam. not indigenous, naturalised
- Cyperus esculentus L. indigenous
  - Cyperus esculentus L. var. cyclolepis Kuk. accepted as Cyperus esculentus L. var. esculentus, present
  - Cyperus esculentus L. var. esculentus, indigenous
  - Cyperus esculentus L. var. nervoso-striatus (Turrill) Kuk. accepted as Cyperus esculentus L. var. esculentus, present
- Cyperus fastigiatus Rottb. indigenous
- Cyperus fenzelianus K.Schum. accepted as Cyperus rotundus L. subsp. tuberosus (Rottb.) Kuk.
- Cyperus fenzelianus Steud. accepted as Cyperus longus L. var. tenuiflorus (Rottb.) Boeck.
- Cyperus flabelliformis Rottb. accepted as Cyperus involucratus Rottb.
- Cyperus flavescens L. accepted as Pycreus flavescens (L.) P.Beauv. ex Rchb.
- Cyperus fulgens C.B.Clarke, indigenous
  - Cyperus fulgens C.B.Clarke var. contractus Kuk. accepted as Cyperus palmatus (Lye) C.Archer & Goetgh. indigenous
- Cyperus globosus All. var. nilagirica (Steud.) C.B.Clarke, accepted as Pycreus betschuanus (Boeck.) C.B.Clarke
- Cyperus haematocephalus Boeck. ex C.B.Clarke, indigenous
- Cyperus hirsutus P.J.Bergius, accepted as Fuirena hirsuta (P.J.Bergius) P.L.Forbes
- Cyperus holostigma C.B.Clarke ex Schweinf. accepted as Cyperus schinzii Boeck.
- Cyperus imbricatus Retz. indigenous
- Cyperus immensus C.B.Clarke, accepted as Cyperus dives Delile, present
- Cyperus indecorus Kunth, indigenous
  - Cyperus indecorus Kunth var. decurvatus (C.B.Clarke) Kuk. accepted as Cyperus decurvatus (C.B.Clarke) C.Archer & Goetgh. indigenous
  - Cyperus indecorus Kunth var. dinteri Kuk. accepted as Cyperus decurvatus (C.B.Clarke) C.Archer & Goetgh.
  - Cyperus indecorus Kunth var. indecorus, endemic
  - Cyperus indecorus Kunth var. inflatus (C.B.Clarke) Kuk. indigenous
  - Cyperus indecorus Kunth var. namaquensis Kuk. indigenous
- Cyperus intactus Vahl, accepted as Pycreus intactus (Vahl) J.Raynal
- Cyperus involucratus Rottb. indigenous
- Cyperus iria L. indigenous
- Cyperus isocladus Kunth, accepted as Cyperus prolifer Lam.
- Cyperus keniensis Kuk. indigenous
- Cyperus kirkii C.B.Clarke, indigenous
- Cyperus kyllingiella Larridon, indigenous
- Cyperus laevigatus L. indigenous
  - Cyperus laevigatus L. subsp. laevigatus, indigenous
  - Cyperus laevigatus L. var. subaphyllus (Boeck.) Kuk. accepted as Cyperus laevigatus L.
- Cyperus lapidicolus Kuk. accepted as Cyperus semitrifidus Schrad.
- Cyperus lateriflorus Steud. accepted as Cyperus longus L. var. tenuiflorus (Rottb.) Boeck. present
- Cyperus latifolius Poir. indigenous
  - Cyperus latifolius Poir. var. angustifolius Hochst. accepted as Cyperus latifolius Poir.
  - Cyperus latifolius Poir. var. austro-africanus Kuk. accepted as Cyperus latifolius Poir.
- Cyperus leptocladus Kunth, indigenous
- Cyperus leucoloma Nees, accepted as Isolepis leucoloma (Nees) C.Archer, present
- Cyperus longus L. indigenous
  - Cyperus longus L. subsp. tenuiflorus (Rottb.) Kuk. accepted as Cyperus longus L. var. tenuiflorus (Rottb.) Boeck.
  - Cyperus longus L. var. longus, indigenous
  - Cyperus longus L. var. tenuiflorus (Rottb.) Boeck. indigenous
- Cyperus macer (Kunth) K.Schum. accepted as Cyperus cyperoides (L.) Kuntze subsp. pseudoflavus (Kuk.) Lye
- Cyperus macranthus Boeck. accepted as Pycreus macranthus (Boeck.) C.B.Clarke
- Cyperus macrocarpus (Kunth) Boeck. indigenous
  - Cyperus macrocarpus (Kunth) Boeck. var. pseudoflavus Kuk. accepted as Cyperus cyperoides (L.) Kuntze subsp. pseudoflavus (Kuk.) Lye
  - Cyperus macrocarpus (Kunth) Boeck. var. submacrocarpus Kuk. accepted as Cyperus macrocarpus (Kunth) Boeck.
- Cyperus macrostachyos Lam. accepted as Pycreus macrostachyos (Lam.) J.Raynal
- Cyperus maculatus Boeck. indigenous
- Cyperus margaritaceus Vahl, indigenous
  - Cyperus margaritaceus Vahl var. margaritaceus, indigenous
- Cyperus marginatus Thunb. indigenous
- Cyperus maritimus Poir. accepted as Cyperus crassipes Vahl
- Cyperus marlothii Boeck. indigenous
- Cyperus melanospermus (Nees) Valck.Sur, accepted as Kyllinga melanosperma Nees
- Cyperus meyerianus Kunth, indigenous
- Cyperus michelianus (L.) Link subsp. pygmaeus (Rottb.) Asch. & Graebn. accepted as Cyperus pygmaeus Rottb.
- Cyperus micromegas Nees, accepted as Isolepis levynsiana Muasya & D.A.Simpson
- Cyperus minutus Roth, accepted as Isolepis marginata (Thunb.) A.Dietr.
- Cyperus monostachyos L. accepted as Abildgaardia ovata (Burm.f.) Kral
- Cyperus multiglumis Turrill, accepted as Cyperus semitrifidus Schrad.
- Cyperus muricatus Kuk. accepted as Pycreus muricatus (Kuk.) Napper
- Cyperus mwinilungensis Podlech var. maior Podlech, accepted as Cyperus mwinilungensis Podlech
- Cyperus natalensis Hochst. indigenous
- Cyperus nervoso-striatus Turrill, accepted as Cyperus esculentus L. var. esculentus, present
- Cyperus nigricans Steud. accepted as Pycreus nigricans (Steud.) C.B.Clarke
- Cyperus nitens Vahl, accepted as Pycreus pumilus (L.) Nees
- Cyperus nitidus Lam. accepted as Pycreus nitidus (Lam.) J.Raynal
- Cyperus niveus Retz. var. flavissimus (Schrad.) Lye, accepted as Cyperus obtusiflorus Vahl var. flavissimus (Schrad.) Boeck.
  - Cyperus niveus Retz. var. leucocephalus (Kunth) Fosberg, accepted as Cyperus obtusiflorus Vahl var. obtusiflorus
- Cyperus nudicaulis Poir. accepted as Cyperus pectinatus Vahl
- Cyperus obtusiflorus Vahl, indigenous
  - Cyperus obtusiflorus Vahl var. flavissimus (Schrad.) Boeck. indigenous
  - Cyperus obtusiflorus Vahl var. obtusiflorus, indigenous
  - Cyperus obtusiflorus Vahl var. sphaerocephalus (Vahl) Kuk. accepted as Cyperus obtusiflorus Vahl var. flavissimus (Schrad.) Boeck. present
- Cyperus owanii Boeck. endemic
  - Cyperus owanii Boeck. var. rogersii Kuk. accepted as Cyperus owanii Boeck. present
- Cyperus palmatus (Lye) C.Archer & Goetgh. indigenous
- Cyperus papyrus L. indigenous
  - Cyperus papyrus L. subsp. papyrus, indigenous
- Cyperus parvinux C.B.Clarke, indigenous
- Cyperus pectinatus Vahl, indigenous
- Cyperus pelophilus Ridl. accepted as Pycreus pelophilus (Ridl.) C.B.Clarke
- Cyperus polystachyos Rottb. accepted as Pycreus polystachyos (Rottb.) P.Beauv. var. polystachyos
- Cyperus prasinus Kunth, accepted as Cyperus leptocladus Kunth
- Cyperus procerus Rottb. indigenous
- Cyperus prolifer Lam. indigenous
  - Cyperus prolifer Lam. var. isocladus (Kunth) Kuk. accepted as Cyperus prolifer Lam.
- Cyperus pseudokyllingioides Kuk. indigenous
  - Cyperus pseudokyllingioides Kuk. var. africanus Kuk. accepted as Cyperus pseudokyllingioides Kuk. indigenous
- Cyperus pseudoleptocladus Kuk. accepted as Cyperus glaucophyllus Boeck. indigenous
  - Cyperus pseudoleptocladus Kuk. var. polycarpus Kuk. accepted as Cyperus glaucophyllus Boeck.
- Cyperus pseudoniveus Boeck. accepted as Cyperus margaritaceus Vahl var. margaritaceus
- Cyperus pseudovestitus (C.B.Clarke) Kuk. indigenous
- Cyperus pulcher Thunb. endemic
- Cyperus pumilus L. accepted as Pycreus pumilus (L.) Nees
- Cyperus pumilus L. var. patens (Vahl) Kuk. accepted as Pycreus pumilus (L.) Nees
- Cyperus purpureus Boeck. accepted as Cyperus schinzii Boeck.
- Cyperus pygmaeus Rottb. indigenous
- Cyperus radiatus Vahl, accepted as Cyperus imbricatus Retz.
- Cyperus remotiflorus Kuk. accepted as Cyperus bellus Kunth
- Cyperus rigidifolius Steud. indigenous
- Cyperus rothianus Roem. & Schult. accepted as Isolepis marginata (Thunb.) A.Dietr.
- Cyperus rotundus L. indigenous
  - Cyperus rotundus L. subsp. rotundus, indigenous
  - Cyperus rotundus L. subsp. rotundus var. platystachys, accepted as Cyperus rotundus L. subsp. tuberosus (Rottb.) Kuk. present
  - Cyperus rotundus L. subsp. tuberosus (Rottb.) Kuk. indigenous
  - Cyperus rotundus L. var. tuberosus (Rottb.) Kuk. accepted as Cyperus rotundus L. subsp. tuberosus (Rottb.) Kuk.
- Cyperus rubicundus Vahl, indigenous
- Cyperus rupestris Kunth, indigenous
  - Cyperus rupestris Kunth var. amnicola (Kunth) Kuk. endemic
  - Cyperus rupestris Kunth var. parvinux (C.B.Clarke) Kuk. accepted as Cyperus parvinux C.B.Clarke, indigenous
  - Cyperus rupestris Kunth var. rupestris, indigenous
- Cyperus schinzii Boeck. indigenous
- Cyperus schlechteri C.B.Clarke, indigenous
- Cyperus semitrifidus Schrad. indigenous
  - Cyperus semitrifidus Schrad. var. multiglumis (Turrill) Kuk. accepted as Cyperus semitrifidus Schrad.
- Cyperus sensilis Baijnath, endemic
- Cyperus sesquiflorus (Torr.) Mattf. & Kuk. accepted as Kyllinga odorata Vahl
- Cyperus sexangularis Nees, indigenous
- Cyperus smithii McLean, accepted as Cyperus leptocladus Kunth
- Cyperus solidus Kunth, indigenous
- Cyperus sphacelatus Rottb. var. tenuior C.B.Clarke, accepted as Cyperus zollingeri Steud.
- Cyperus sphaerocephalus Vahl, accepted as Cyperus obtusiflorus Vahl var. flavissimus (Schrad.) Boeck.
- Cyperus sphaerospermus Schrad. indigenous
  - Cyperus sphaerospermus Schrad. var. minor Schrad. accepted as Cyperus sphaerospermus Schrad. present
- Cyperus squarrosus L. indigenous
- Cyperus subparadoxus Kuk. accepted as Alinula paradoxa (Cherm.) Goetgh. & Vorster
- Cyperus subumbellatus Kuk. accepted as Cyperus cyperoides (L.) Kuntze subsp. flavus Lye
- Cyperus tabularis Schrad. endemic
- Cyperus tenax Boeck. indigenous
- Cyperus tenellus L.f. accepted as Isolepis levynsiana Muasya & D.A.Simpson, endemic
  - Cyperus tenellus L.f. var. gracilis Nees, accepted as Cyperus tenellus L.f. var. tenellus, present
  - Cyperus tenellus L.f. var. micromegas (Nees) F.Muell. accepted as Isolepis levynsiana Muasya & D.A.Simpson, endemic
- Cyperus teneriffae Poir. accepted as Cyperus rubicundus Vahl
  - Cyperus teneriffae Poir. var. succulentus Dinter ex Kuk. accepted as Cyperus rubicundus Vahl
- Cyperus tenuispica Steud. indigenous
- Cyperus textilis Thunb. endemic
- Cyperus thorncroftii McClean, accepted as Cyperus kirkii C.B.Clarke, present
- Cyperus thunbergii Vahl, endemic
- Cyperus triflorus L. accepted as Abildgaardia triflora (L.) Abeyw.
- Cyperus tuberosus Rottb. accepted as Cyperus rotundus L. subsp. tuberosus (Rottb.) Kuk.
- Cyperus turrillii Kuk. indigenous
- Cyperus uitenhagensis (Steud.) C.Archer & Goetgh. indigenous
- Cyperus uncinatus Poir. accepted as Cyperus cuspidatus Kunth
- Cyperus unioloides R.Br. accepted as Pycreus unioloides (R.Br.) Urb.
- Cyperus usitatus Burch. indigenous
  - Cyperus usitatus Burch. subsp. palmatus Lye, accepted as Cyperus palmatus (Lye) C.Archer & Goetgh. indigenous
  - Cyperus usitatus Burch. var. macrobulbus Kuk. accepted as Cyperus usitatus Burch. indigenous
- Cyperus vegetus Willd. accepted as Cyperus eragrostis Lam.
- Cyperus vestitus Hochst. indigenous
- Cyperus vorsteri K.L.Wilson, endemic
- Cyperus x turbatus Baijnath, endemic
- Cyperus zollingeri Steud. indigenous

=== Dracoscirpoides ===
Genus Dracoscirpoides:

- Dracoscirpoides falsa (C.B.Clarke) Muasya, indigenous
- Dracoscirpoides ficinioides (Kunth) Muasya, indigenous
- Dracoscirpoides surculosa Muasya, Reynders & Goetgh. indigenous

=== Eleocharis ===
Genus Eleocharis:

- Eleocharis acutangula (Roxb.) Schult. indigenous
- Eleocharis atropurpurea (Retz.) J.Presl & C.Presl, indigenous
- Eleocharis caduca (Delile) Schult. indigenous
- Eleocharis dregeana Steud. indigenous
- Eleocharis dulcis (Burm.f.) Trin. ex Hensch. indigenous
- Eleocharis geniculata (L.) Roem. & Schult. indigenous
- Eleocharis intricata Kuk. accepted as Eleocharis caduca (Delile) Schult. present
- Eleocharis limosa (Schrad.) Schult. indigenous
- Eleocharis mutata (L.) Roem. & Schult. indigenous
- Eleocharis schlechteri C.B.Clarke, indigenous
- Eleocharis variegata (Poir.) C.Presl, indigenous

=== Epischoenus ===
Genus Epischoenus:

- Epischoenus adnatus Levyns, endemic
- Epischoenus cernuus Levyns, endemic
- Epischoenus complanatus Levyns, endemic
- Epischoenus dregeanus (Boeck.) Levyns, endemic
- Epischoenus gracilis Levyns, endemic
- Epischoenus lucidus (C.B.Clarke) Levyns, endemic
- Epischoenus quadrangularis (Boeck.) C.B.Clarke, endemic
- Epischoenus villosus Levyns, endemic

=== Ficinia ===
Genus Ficinia:

- Ficinia acrostachys (Steud.) C.B.Clarke, indigenous
- Ficinia acuminata (Nees) Nees, endemic
- Ficinia albicans Nees, endemic
- Ficinia anceps Nees, endemic
- Ficinia angustifolia (Schrad.) Levyns [2], endemic
- Ficinia anysbergensis Muasya, endemic
- Ficinia arenicola T.H.Arnold & Gordon-Gray, indigenous
  - Ficinia arenicola T.H.Arnold & Gordon-Gray var. arenicola, endemic
  - Ficinia arenicola T.H.Arnold & Gordon-Gray var. erecta T.H.Arnold & Gordon-Gray, endemic
- Ficinia argyropa Nees, endemic
- Ficinia arnoldii Tshiila & Muasya, endemic
- Ficinia bergiana Kunth, accepted as Ficinia tristachya (Rottb.) Nees, present
- Ficinia brevifolia Kunth, endemic
- Ficinia bulbosa (L.) Nees, endemic
- Ficinia capillifolia (Schrad.) C.B.Clarke, endemic
- Ficinia capitella (Thunb.) Nees, endemic
- Ficinia cedarbergensis T.H.Arnold & Gordon-Gray, endemic
- Ficinia cinnamomea C.B.Clarke, indigenous
- Ficinia compasbergensis Drege, endemic
- Ficinia crinita (Poir.) B.L.Burtt, endemic
- Ficinia dasystachys C.B.Clarke, endemic
- Ficinia decidua H.Pfeiff. accepted as Ficinia monticola Kunth, present
- Ficinia deusta (P.J.Bergius) Levyns, endemic
- Ficinia distans C.B.Clarke, endemic
- Ficinia dunensis Levyns, endemic
- Ficinia dura Turrill, endemic
- Ficinia ecklonea (Steud.) Nees, endemic
- Ficinia elatior Levyns, endemic
- Ficinia esterhuyseniae Muasya, endemic
- Ficinia fascicularis Nees, endemic
- Ficinia fastigiata (Thunb.) Nees, endemic
- Ficinia filiculmea B.L.Burtt, indigenous
- Ficinia filiformis (Lam.) Schrad. endemic
- Ficinia gracilis Schrad. indigenous
- Ficinia grandiflora T.H.Arnold & Gordon-Gray, endemic
- Ficinia gydomontana T.H.Arnold, endemic
- Ficinia indica (Lam.) H.Pfeiff. endemic
- Ficinia ixioides Nees, indigenous
  - Ficinia ixioides Nees subsp. glabra T.H.Arnold & Gordon-Gray, endemic
  - Ficinia ixioides Nees subsp. ixioides, endemic
- Ficinia jardinei Muasya & C.H.Stirt. indigenous
- Ficinia laciniata (Thunb.) Nees, endemic
- Ficinia laevis (Vahl) Nees, endemic
- Ficinia lateralis (Vahl) Kunth, endemic
- Ficinia latifolia T.H.Arnold & Gordon-Gray, endemic
- Ficinia levynsiae T.H.Arnold & Gordon-Gray, endemic
- Ficinia limosa Levyns, accepted as Ficinia pygmaea Boeck.
- Ficinia macowanii C.B.Clarke, indigenous
- Ficinia micrantha C.B.Clarke, endemic
- Ficinia minutiflora C.B.Clarke, endemic
- Ficinia montana Tshiila & Muasya, endemic
- Ficinia monticola Kunth, endemic
- Ficinia mucronata C.B.Clarke, endemic
- Ficinia nigrescens (Schrad.) J.Raynal, indigenous
- Ficinia nodosa (Rottb.) Goetgh. Muasya & D.A.Simpson, indigenous
- Ficinia oligantha (Steud.) J.Raynal, endemic
- Ficinia overbergensis Muasya & C.H.Stirt. indigenous
- Ficinia pallens (Schrad.) Nees, indigenous
  - Ficinia pallens (Schrad.) Nees var. lithosperma (Boeck.) T.H.Arnold & Gordon-Gray, endemic
  - Ficinia pallens (Schrad.) Nees var. pallens, endemic
- Ficinia paradoxa (Schrad.) Nees, endemic
- Ficinia petrophila T.H.Arnold & Gordon-Gray, endemic
- Ficinia pinguior C.B.Clarke, endemic
- Ficinia polystachya Levyns, endemic
- Ficinia praemorsa Nees, endemic
- Ficinia pygmaea Boeck. endemic
- Ficinia quartzicola Muasya & Helme, indigenous
- Ficinia quinquangularis Boeck. endemic
- Ficinia radiata (L.f.) Kunth, endemic
- Ficinia ramosissima Kunth, endemic
- Ficinia repens (Nees) Kunth, endemic
- Ficinia rigida Levyns, endemic
- Ficinia secunda (Vahl) Kunth, endemic
- Ficinia stolonifera Boeck. indigenous
- Ficinia sylvatica Kunth, accepted as Ficinia trispicata (L.f.) Druce, present
- Ficinia tenuifolia Kunth, accepted as Ficinia filiformis (Lam.) Schrad. present
- Ficinia trichodes (Schrad.) Benth. & Hook.f. endemic
- Ficinia trispicata (L.f.) Druce, endemic
- Ficinia tristachya (Rottb.) Nees, endemic
- Ficinia truncata (Thunb.) Schrad. endemic
- Ficinia undosa B.L.Burtt, accepted as Ficinia gracilis Schrad. present
- Ficinia zeyheri Boeck. endemic

=== Fimbristylis ===
Genus Fimbristylis:

- Fimbristylis aphylla Steud. indigenous
- Fimbristylis bisumbellata (Forssk.) Bubani, indigenous
- Fimbristylis bivalvis (Lam.) Lye, indigenous
- Fimbristylis complanata (Retz.) Link, indigenous
  - Fimbristylis complanata (Retz.) Link subsp. complanata, indigenous
- Fimbristylis dichotoma (L.) Vahl [9], indigenous
  - Fimbristylis dichotoma (L.) Vahl subsp. dichotoma, indigenous
- Fimbristylis ferruginea (L.) Vahl, indigenous
- Fimbristylis microcarya F.Muell. indigenous
- Fimbristylis obtusifolia (Lam.) Kunth [1], accepted as Fimbristylis dichotoma (L.) Vahl subsp. dichotoma, indigenous
- Fimbristylis squarrosa Vahl, indigenous
- Fimbristylis variegata Gordon-Gray, endemic
- Fimbristylis x dregeana Kunth, endemic

=== Fuirena ===
Genus Fuirena:

- Fuirena bullifera J.Raynal & Roessler, indigenous
- Fuirena ciliaris (L.) Roxb. indigenous
  - Fuirena ciliaris (L.) Roxb. var. ciliaris, indigenous
- Fuirena coerulescens Steud. indigenous
- Fuirena ecklonii Nees, endemic
- Fuirena enodis C.B.Clarke, accepted as Fuirena coerulescens Steud. present
- Fuirena gracilis Kunth, accepted as Fuirena coerulescens Steud. present
- Fuirena hirsuta (P.J.Bergius) P.L.Forbes, indigenous
- Fuirena leptostachya Oliv. indigenous
  - Fuirena leptostachya Oliv. forma leptostachya, indigenous
  - Fuirena leptostachya Oliv. forma nudiflora Lye, indigenous
- Fuirena obcordata P.L.Forbes, indigenous
- Fuirena pachyrrhiza Ridl. indigenous
- Fuirena pubescens (Poir.) Kunth, indigenous
  - Fuirena pubescens (Poir.) Kunth var. pubescens, indigenous
- Fuirena stricta Steud. indigenous
  - Fuirena stricta Steud. subsp. chlorocarpa (Ridl.) Lye, accepted as Fuirena stricta Steud. var. chlorocarpa (Ridl.) Kuk.
  - Fuirena stricta Steud. var. stricta, indigenous
- Fuirena tenuis P.L.Forbes, indigenous
- Fuirena umbellata Rottb. indigenous

=== Hellmuthia ===
Genus Hellmuthia:

- Hellmuthia membranacea (Thunb.) R.W.Haines & Lye, endemic

=== Holoschoenus ===
Genus Holoschoenus:

- Holoschoenus thunbergii (Schrad.) A.Dietr. accepted as Scirpoides thunbergii (Schrad.) Sojak, indigenous

=== Isolepis ===
Genus Isolepis:

- Isolepis aciformis (B.Nord.) J.Raynal, accepted as Isolepis hemiuncialis (C.B.Clarke) J.Raynal, present
- Isolepis angelica B.L.Burtt, indigenous
- Isolepis antarctica (L.) Roem. & Schult. [1], endemic
- Isolepis brevicaulis (Levyns) J.Raynal, indigenous
- Isolepis bulbifera (Boeck.) Muasya, endemic
- Isolepis capensis Muasya, endemic
- Isolepis cernua (Vahl) Roem. & Schult. indigenous
  - Isolepis cernua (Vahl) Roem. & Schult. var. cernua, indigenous
  - Isolepis cernua (Vahl) Roem. & Schult. var. setiformis (Benth.) Muasya, indigenous
- Isolepis costata Hochst. ex A.Rich. indigenous
- Isolepis diabolica (Steud.) Schrad. endemic
- Isolepis digitata Schrad. endemic
- Isolepis dioeca Kunth, accepted as Afroscirpoides dioeca (Kunth) Garcia-Madr. indigenous
- Isolepis expallescens Kunth, endemic
- Isolepis fluitans (L.) R.Br. indigenous
  - Isolepis fluitans (L.) R.Br. var. fluitans, indigenous
- Isolepis hemiuncialis (C.B.Clarke) J.Raynal, indigenous
- Isolepis hystrix (Thunb.) Nees [2], endemic
- Isolepis incomtula Nees, endemic
- Isolepis inconspicua (Levyns) J.Raynal, endemic
- Isolepis inyangensis Muasya & Goetgh. indigenous
- Isolepis karroica (C.B.Clarke) J.Raynal, indigenous
- Isolepis leptostachya Kunth, endemic
- Isolepis leucoloma (Nees) C.Archer, endemic
- Isolepis levynsiana Muasya & D.A.Simpson, endemic
- Isolepis ludwigii (Steud.) Kunth, endemic
- Isolepis marginata (Thunb.) A.Dietr. indigenous
- Isolepis minuta (Turrill) J.Raynal, endemic
- Isolepis namaquana Muasya & J.Viljoen, indigenous
- Isolepis natans (Thunb.) A.Dietr. indigenous
- Isolepis prolifera (Rottb.) R.Br. indigenous
- Isolepis pusilla Kunth, endemic
- Isolepis rubicunda (Nees) Kunth, endemic
- Isolepis sepulcralis Steud. indigenous
- Isolepis setacea (L.) R.Br. [2], indigenous
- Isolepis sororia Kunth, endemic
- Isolepis striata (Nees) Kunth, endemic
- Isolepis tenuis (Spreng.) Schrad. accepted as Isolepis pusilla Kunth, present
- Isolepis tenuissima (Nees) Kunth, endemic
- Isolepis thunbergii Schrad. accepted as Scirpoides thunbergii (Schrad.) Sojak, indigenous
- Isolepis trachysperma Nees, indigenous
- Isolepis venustula Kunth, endemic
- Isolepis verrucosula (Steud.) Nees, accepted as Isolepis cernua (Vahl) Roem. & Schult. var. setiformis (Benth.) Muasya, present
- Isolepis x pellocolea B.L.Burtt, endemic

=== Kobresia ===
Genus Kobresia:

- Kobresia basutorum (Turrill) T.Koyama, accepted as Carex basutorum (Turrill) Luceno & Martin-Bravo, indigenous
- Kobresia buchananii (C.B.Clarke) T.Koyama, accepted as Carex kukkoneniana Luceno & Martin-Bravo, indigenous
- Kobresia ecklonii (Nees) T.Koyama, accepted as Carex capensis Thunb. endemic
- Kobresia filiforme (Kuk.) T.Koyama, accepted as Carex killickii Nelmes, indigenous
- Kobresia kunthiana (Kuk.) T.Koyama, accepted as Carex spartea Wahlenb. indigenous
- Kobresia lancea (Thunb.) T.Koyama, accepted as Carex lancea (Thunb.) Baill. indigenous
- Kobresia lehmannii (Nees) T.Koyama, accepted as Carex uhligii K.Schum. ex C.B.Clarke, indigenous
  - Kobresia lehmannii (Nees) T.Koyama var. schimperiana (Boeck.) T.Koyama, accepted as Carex schimperiana Boeck. indigenous
- Kobresia rufa (Nees) T.Koyama, accepted as Carex ludwigii (Hochst.) Luceno & Martin-Bravo, indigenous
- Kobresia schweickerdtii (Merxm. & Podlech) T.Koyama, accepted as Carex schweickerdtii (Merxm. & Podlech) Luceno & Martin-Bravo, indigenous
- Kobresia spartea (Wahlenb.) T.Koyama, accepted as Carex spartea Wahlenb. indigenous
- Kobresia thunbergii (Nees) T.Koyama, accepted as Carex capensis Thunb. indigenous

=== Kyllinga ===
Genus Kyllinga:

- Kyllinga alata Nees, indigenous
- Kyllinga alba Nees, indigenous
  - Kyllinga alba Nees subsp. alba, indigenous
- Kyllinga brevifolia Rottb. indigenous
  - Kyllinga brevifolia Rottb. var. brevifolia, indigenous
- Kyllinga cyperoides Roxb. accepted as Cyperus pseudokyllingioides Kuk. indigenous
- Kyllinga elatior Kunth, indigenous
- Kyllinga erecta Schumach. indigenous
  - Kyllinga erecta Schumach. var. erecta, indigenous
- Kyllinga intricata Cherm. accepted as Kyllinga erecta Schumach. var. erecta, present
- Kyllinga melanosperma Nees, indigenous
  - Kyllinga melanosperma Nees var. melanosperma, indigenous
- Kyllinga odorata Vahl, indigenous
- Kyllinga pauciflora Ridl. indigenous
- Kyllinga polyphylla Willd. ex Kunth, indigenous
- Kyllinga pulchella Kunth, indigenous
- Kyllinga x nemoralis (G.Forst. & J.R.Forst.) Dandy ex Hutch. & Dalziel, indigenous

=== Kyllingiella ===
Genus Kyllingiella:

- Kyllingiella microcephala (Steud.) R.W.Haines & Lye, accepted as Cyperus kyllingiella Larridon, indigenous

=== Lipocarpha ===
Genus Lipocarpha:

- Lipocarpha chinensis (Osbeck) J.Kern, indigenous
- Lipocarpha hemisphaerica (Roth) Goetgh. indigenous
- Lipocarpha micrantha (Vahl) G.C.Tucker, indigenous
- Lipocarpha nana (A.Rich.) Cherm. indigenous
- Lipocarpha rehmannii (Ridl.) Goetgh. indigenous

=== Macrochaetium ===
Genus Macrochaetium:

- Macrochaetium dregei Steud. accepted as Cyathocoma hexandra (Nees) Browning, present
- Macrochaetium ecklonii (Nees) Levyns, accepted as Cyathocoma ecklonii Nees, present
- Macrochaetium hexandrum (Nees) Pfeiff. accepted as Cyathocoma hexandra (Nees) Browning, present

=== Mariscus ===
Genus Mariscus:

- Mariscus aristatus (Rottb.) Cherm. var. atriceps (Kuk.) Podlech, accepted as Cyperus atriceps (Kuk.) C.Archer & Goetgh. indigenous
- Mariscus assimilis (Steud.) Podlech, accepted as Cyperus assimilis Steud. indigenous
- Mariscus cyperoides (Roxb.) A.Dietr. accepted as Cyperus pseudokyllingioides Kuk. indigenous
- Mariscus cyperoides (Roxb.) A.Dietr. subsp. africanus (Kuk.) Podlech, accepted as Cyperus pseudokyllingioides Kuk. indigenous
- Mariscus dregeanus Kunth, accepted as Cyperus austro-africanus C.Archer & Goetgh. indigenous
- Mariscus gueinzii C.B.Clarke, accepted as Cyperus solidus Kunth, present
- Mariscus indecorus (Kunth) Podlech, accepted as Cyperus indecorus Kunth var. indecorus
- Mariscus solidus (Kunth) Vorster, accepted as Cyperus solidus Kunth
- Mariscus sumatrensis (Retz.) J.Raynal, accepted as Cyperus cyperoides (L.) Kuntze subsp. cyperoides
- Mariscus uitenhagensis Steud. accepted as Cyperus uitenhagensis (Steud.) C.Archer & Goetgh. indigenous

=== Neesenbeckia ===
Genus Neesenbeckia:

- Neesenbeckia punctoria (Vahl) Levyns, endemic

=== Oxycaryum ===
Genus Oxycaryum:

- Oxycaryum cubense (Poepp. & Kunth) Palla, accepted as Cyperus blepharoleptos Steud. indigenous

=== Pseudomariscus ===
Genus Pseudomariscus:

- Pseudomariscus cyperoides (Roxb.) Rauschert, accepted as Cyperus pseudokyllingioides Kuk. indigenous

=== Pseudoschoenus ===
Genus Pseudoschoenus:

- Pseudoschoenus inanis (Thunb.) Oteng-Yeb. indigenous

=== Pycreus ===
Genus Pycreus:

- Pycreus atribulbus (Kuk.) Napper, indigenous
- Pycreus betschuanus (Boeck.) C.B.Clarke, indigenous
- Pycreus chrysanthus (Boeck.) C.B.Clarke, indigenous
- Pycreus cooperi C.B.Clarke, indigenous
- Pycreus flavescens (L.) P.Beauv. ex Rchb. indigenous
  - Pycreus flavescens (L.) Rchb. subsp. flavescens, indigenous
- Pycreus intactus (Vahl) J.Raynal, indigenous
- Pycreus macranthus (Boeck.) C.B.Clarke, indigenous
- Pycreus macrostachyos (Lam.) J.Raynal, indigenous
- Pycreus mundii Nees, indigenous
- Pycreus muricatus (Kuk.) Napper, indigenous
- Pycreus niger (Ruiz & Pav.) Cufod. indigenous
  - Pycreus niger (Ruiz & Pav.) Cufod. subsp. elegantulus (Steud.) Lye, indigenous
- Pycreus nigricans (Steud.) C.B.Clarke, indigenous
- Pycreus nitidus (Lam.) J.Raynal, indigenous
- Pycreus oakfortensis C.B.Clarke, indigenous
- Pycreus pelophilus (Ridl.) C.B.Clarke, indigenous
- Pycreus permutatus (Boeck.) Napper, indigenous
- Pycreus polystachyos (Rottb.) P.Beauv. indigenous
  - Pycreus polystachyos (Rottb.) P.Beauv. var. polystachyos, indigenous
- Pycreus pumilus (L.) Nees, indigenous
- Pycreus rehmannianus C.B.Clarke, indigenous
- Pycreus sanguinolentus (Vahl) Nees, indigenous
- Pycreus unioloides (R.Br.) Urb. indigenous

=== Rhynchospora ===
Genus Rhynchospora:

- Rhynchospora barrosiana Guagl. indigenous
- Rhynchospora brownii Roem. & Schult. indigenous
- Rhynchospora gracillima Thwaites, indigenous
  - Rhynchospora gracillima Thwaites subsp. subquadrata (Cherm.) J.Raynal, indigenous
- Rhynchospora holoschoenoides (Rich.) Herter, indigenous
- Rhynchospora perrieri Cherm. indigenous
- Rhynchospora rubra (Lour.) Makino, indigenous
  - Rhynchospora rubra (Lour.) Makino subsp. africana J.Raynal, indigenous
- Rhynchospora rugosa (Vahl) Gale subsp. brownii (Roem. & Schult.) T.Koyama, accepted as Rhynchospora brownii Roem. & Schult. indigenous
- Rhynchospora spectabilis Hochst. indigenous

=== Schoenoplectus ===
Genus Schoenoplectus:

- Schoenoplectus articulatus (L.) Palla, indigenous
- Schoenoplectus brachyceras (Hochst. ex A.Rich.) Lye, indigenous
- Schoenoplectus confusus (N.E.Br.) Lye, indigenous
  - Schoenoplectus confusus (N.E.Br.) Lye subsp. natalitius Browning, endemic
- Schoenoplectus corymbosus (Roth ex Roem. & Schult.) J.Raynal, indigenous
  - Schoenoplectus corymbosus (Roth ex Roem. & Schult.) J.Raynal var. brachyceras (A.Rich.) Lye, accepted as Schoenoplectus brachyceras (Hochst. ex A.Rich.) Lye, present
- Schoenoplectus decipiens (Nees) J.Raynal, indigenous
- Schoenoplectus erectus (Poir.) Palla ex J.Raynal, indigenous
- Schoenoplectus leucanthus (Boeck.) J.Raynal, indigenous
- Schoenoplectus muricinux (C.B.Clarke) J.Raynal, indigenous
- Schoenoplectus muriculatus (Kuk.) Browning, indigenous
- Schoenoplectus paludicola (Kunth) Palla, endemic
- Schoenoplectus patentiglumis Hayas. indigenous
- Schoenoplectus pulchellus (Kunth) J.Raynal, indigenous
- Schoenoplectus scirpoides (Schrad.) Browning, indigenous
- Schoenoplectus senegalensis (Hochst. ex Steud.) Palla, indigenous
- Schoenoplectus tabernaemontani (C.C.Gmel.) Palla, not indigenous, naturalised
- Schoenoplectus triqueter (L.) Palla, not indigenous, naturalised

=== Schoenoxiphium ===
Genus Schoenoxiphium:

- Schoenoxiphium altum Kukkonen, accepted as Carex capensis Thunb. endemic
- Schoenoxiphium basutorum Turrill, accepted as Carex basutorum (Turrill) Luceno & Martin-Bravo, indigenous
- Schoenoxiphium bracteosum Kukkonen, accepted as Carex schimperiana Boeck. indigenous
- Schoenoxiphium buchananii C.B.Clarke ex C.B.Clarke, accepted as Carex kukkoneniana Luceno & Martin-Bravo, indigenous
- Schoenoxiphium burkei C.B.Clarke, accepted as Carex burkei (C.B.Clarke) Luceno & Martin-Bravo, indigenous
- Schoenoxiphium burttii Kukkonen, accepted as Carex pseudorufa Luceno & Martin-Bravo, endemic
- Schoenoxiphium capense Nees, accepted as Carex lancea (Thunb.) Baill. indigenous
- Schoenoxiphium caricoides C.B.Clarke, accepted as Carex spartea Wahlenb. indigenous
  - Schoenoxiphium caricoides C.B.Clarke var. major (C.B.Clarke) C.B.Clarke, accepted as Carex spartea Wahlenb. indigenous
- Schoenoxiphium distinctum Kukkonen, accepted as Carex distincta (Kukkonen) Luceno & Martin-Bravo, indigenous
- Schoenoxiphium dregeanum Kunth, accepted as Carex ludwigii (Hochst.) Luceno & Martin-Bravo, indigenous
- Schoenoxiphium ecklonii Nees, accepted as Carex capensis Thunb. endemic
  - Schoenoxiphium ecklonii Nees var. unisexuale Kuk. accepted as Carex capensis Thunb. endemic
- Schoenoxiphium filiforme Kuk. accepted as Carex killickii Nelmes, indigenous
- Schoenoxiphium kunthianum Kuk. accepted as Carex spartea Wahlenb. indigenous
- Schoenoxiphium lanceum (Thunb.) Kuk. accepted as Carex lancea (Thunb.) Baill. endemic
- Schoenoxiphium lehmannii (Nees) Kunth ex Steud. accepted as Carex uhligii K.Schum. ex C.B.Clarke, indigenous
- Schoenoxiphium ludwigii Hochst. accepted as Carex ludwigii (Hochst.) Luceno & Martin-Bravo, indigenous
- Schoenoxiphium madagascariense Cherm. accepted as Carex multispiculata Luceno & Martin-Bravo, indigenous
- Schoenoxiphium meyerianum Kunth, accepted as Carex lancea (Thunb.) Baill. indigenous
- Schoenoxiphium molle Kukkonen, accepted as Carex killickii Nelmes, endemic
- Schoenoxiphium perdensum Kukkonen, accepted as Carex perdensa (Kukkonen) Luceno & Martin-Bravo, endemic
- Schoenoxiphium rufum Nees, accepted as Carex ludwigii (Hochst.) Luceno & Martin-Bravo, endemic
  - Schoenoxiphium rufum Nees var. dregeanum (Kunth) Kuk. accepted as Carex ludwigii (Hochst.) Luceno & Martin-Bravo, endemic
  - Schoenoxiphium rufum Nees var. pondoense Kuk. accepted as Carex ludwigii (Hochst.) Luceno & Martin-Bravo, endemic
- Schoenoxiphium schimperianum (Boeck.) C.B.Clarke, accepted as Carex schimperiana Boeck. indigenous
- Schoenoxiphium schweickerdtii Merxm. & Podlech, accepted as Carex schweickerdtii (Merxm. & Podlech) Luceno & Martin-Bravo, endemic
- Schoenoxiphium sickmannianum Kunth, accepted as Carex lancea (Thunb.) Baill. indigenous
- Schoenoxiphium sparteum (Wahlenb.) C.B.Clarke, accepted as Carex spartea Wahlenb. indigenous
  - Schoenoxiphium sparteum (Wahlenb.) C.B.Clarke var. lehmannii (Nees) Kuk. accepted as Carex uhligii K.Schum. ex C.B.Clarke, indigenous
  - Schoenoxiphium sparteum (Wahlenb.) C.B.Clarke var. schimperianum (Boeck.) Kuk. accepted as Carex schimperiana Boeck. indigenous
- Schoenoxiphium strictum Kukkonen, accepted as Carex killickii Nelmes, endemic
- Schoenoxiphium thunbergii Nees, accepted as Carex capensis Thunb. endemic

=== Schoenus ===
Genus Schoenus:

- Schoenus glomeratus Thunb. accepted as Carpha glomerata (Thunb.) Nees
- Schoenus lanceus Thunb. accepted as Carex lancea (Thunb.) Baill. indigenous
- Schoenus nigricans L. indigenous

=== Scirpoides ===
Genus Scirpoides:

- Scirpoides burkei (C.B.Clarke) Goetgh. Muasya & D.A.Simpson, indigenous
- Scirpoides dioeca (Kunth) Browning, accepted as Afroscirpoides dioeca (Kunth) Garcia-Madr. indigenous
- Scirpoides nodosus (Rottb.) Sojak, accepted as Ficinia nodosa (Rottb.) Goetgh. Muasya & D.A.Simpson, present
- Scirpoides thunbergii (Schrad.) Sojak, endemic
- Scirpoides varia Browning, indigenous

=== Scirpus ===
Genus Scirpus:

- Scirpus bulbiferus Boeck. accepted as Isolepis bulbifera (Boeck.) Muasya, present
- Scirpus burkei C.B.Clarke, accepted as Scirpoides burkei (C.B.Clarke) Goetgh. Muasya & D.A.Simpson, present
- Scirpus cubensis Poepp. & Kunth, accepted as Cyperus blepharoleptos Steud. present
- Scirpus diabolicus Steud. accepted as Isolepis diabolica (Steud.) Schrad. present
- Scirpus dioecus (Kunth) Boeck. accepted as Afroscirpoides dioeca (Kunth) Garcia-Madr. indigenous
- Scirpus dregeanus C.B.Clarke, accepted as Isolepis capensis Muasya, present
- Scirpus falsus C.B.Clarke, accepted as Dracoscirpoides falsa (C.B.Clarke) Muasya, indigenous
- Scirpus ficinioides Kunth, accepted as Dracoscirpoides ficinioides (Kunth) Muasya, indigenous
- Scirpus holoschoenus L. var. thunbergii (Schrad.) C.B.Clarke, accepted as Scirpoides thunbergii (Schrad.) Sojak, indigenous
- Scirpus maritimus L. accepted as Bolboschoenus maritimus (L.) Palla, not indigenous, naturalised, invasive
- Scirpus microcephalus (Steud.) Dandy, accepted as Cyperus kyllingiella Larridon, present
- Scirpus nodosus Rottb. accepted as Ficinia nodosa (Rottb.) Goetgh. Muasya & D.A.Simpson, present
- Scirpus pinguiculus C.B.Clarke, endemic
- Scirpus schinzii Boeck. accepted as Afroscirpoides dioeca (Kunth) Garcia-Madr.
- Scirpus thunbergianus Nees ex Levyns, accepted as Scirpoides thunbergii (Schrad.) Sojak, indigenous
- Scirpus thunbergii (Schrad.) A.Spreng. accepted as Scirpoides thunbergii (Schrad.) Sojak, indigenous
- Scirpus varius Boeck. ex C.B.Clarke, accepted as Scirpoides varia Browning, indigenous

=== Scleria ===
Genus Scleria:

- Scleria achtenii De Wild. indigenous
- Scleria angusta Nees ex Kunth, indigenous
- Scleria aterrima (Ridl.) Napper, accepted as Scleria catophylla C.B.Clarke, indigenous
- Scleria bulbifera Hochst. ex A.Rich. indigenous
- Scleria catophylla C.B.Clarke, indigenous
- Scleria dieterlenii Turrill, indigenous
- Scleria distans Poir. indigenous
  - Scleria distans Poir. var. distans, indigenous
- Scleria dregeana Kunth, indigenous
- Scleria foliosa Hochst. ex A.Rich. indigenous
- Scleria greigiifolia (Ridl.) C.B.Clarke, indigenous
- Scleria melanomphala Kunth, indigenous
- Scleria natalensis Boeck. ex C.B.Clarke, endemic
- Scleria nutans Willd. ex Kunth, accepted as Scleria distans Poir. present
- Scleria pergracilis (Nees) Kunth, indigenous
- Scleria poiformis Retz. indigenous
- Scleria rehmannii C.B.Clarke, indigenous
- Scleria sobolifer E.F.Franklin, endemic
- Scleria transvaalensis E.F.Franklin, indigenous
- Scleria unguiculata E.A.Rob. indigenous
- Scleria welwitschii C.B.Clarke, indigenous
- Scleria woodii C.B.Clarke, indigenous

=== Tetraria ===
Genus Tetraria:

- Tetraria autumnalis Levyns, accepted as Tetraria ligulata (Boeck.) C.B.Clarke, present
- Tetraria bachmannii Kuk. accepted as Cyathocoma bachmannii (Kuk.) C.Archer, present
- Tetraria bolusii C.B.Clarke, endemic
- Tetraria brachyphylla Levyns, endemic
- Tetraria brevicaulis C.B.Clarke, accepted as Capeobolus brevicaulis (C.B.Clarke) Browning, present
- Tetraria bromoides (Lam.) H.Pfeiff. endemic
- Tetraria burmannii (Vahl) C.B.Clarke, endemic
- Tetraria capillacea (Thunb.) C.B.Clarke, endemic
- Tetraria compacta Levyns, endemic
- Tetraria compar (L.) P.Beauv. endemic
- Tetraria crassa Levyns, endemic
- Tetraria crinifolia (Nees) C.B.Clarke, endemic
- Tetraria cuspidata (Rottb.) C.B.Clarke, indigenous
  - Tetraria cuspidata (Rottb.) C.B.Clarke var. cuspidata, indigenous
  - Tetraria cuspidata (Rottb.) C.B.Clarke var. lorea (Nees) C.B.Clarke, endemic
- Tetraria exilis Levyns, endemic
- Tetraria eximia C.B.Clarke, endemic
- Tetraria fasciata (Rottb.) C.B.Clarke, endemic
- Tetraria ferruginea C.B.Clarke, endemic
- Tetraria fimbriolata (Nees) C.B.Clarke, endemic
- Tetraria flexuosa (Thunb.) C.B.Clarke, endemic
- Tetraria fourcadei Turrill & Schonland, endemic
- Tetraria galpinii Schonland & Turrill, endemic
- Tetraria graminifolia Levyns, endemic
- Tetraria involucrata (Rottb.) C.B.Clarke, endemic
- Tetraria ligulata (Boeck.) C.B.Clarke, endemic
- Tetraria maculata Schonland & Turrill, endemic
- Tetraria microstachys (Vahl) H.Pfeiff. endemic
- Tetraria nigrovaginata (Nees) C.B.Clarke, endemic
- Tetraria paludosa Levyns, endemic
- Tetraria picta (Boeck.) C.B.Clarke, endemic
- Tetraria pillansii Levyns, endemic
- Tetraria pubescens Schonland & Turrill, endemic
- Tetraria pygmaea Levyns, endemic
- Tetraria robusta (Kunth) C.B.Clarke, endemic
- Tetraria schonlandii Turrill, endemic
- Tetraria secans C.B.Clarke, endemic
- Tetraria sylvatica (Nees) C.B.Clarke, indigenous
  - Tetraria sylvatica (Nees) C.B.Clarke var. pseudolorea Kuk. endemic
  - Tetraria sylvatica (Nees) C.B.Clarke var. sylvatica, endemic
  - Tetraria sylvatica (Nees) C.B.Clarke var. triflora Kuk. endemic
- Tetraria thermalis (L.) C.B.Clarke, endemic
- Tetraria triangularis (Boeck.) C.B.Clarke, endemic
- Tetraria ustulata (L.) C.B.Clarke, endemic
- Tetraria vaginata Schonland & Turrill, endemic
- Tetraria variabilis Levyns, endemic

=== Trianoptiles ===
Genus Trianoptiles:

- Trianoptiles capensis (Steud.) Harv. endemic
- Trianoptiles solitaria (C.B.Clarke) Levyns, endemic
- Trianoptiles stipitata Levyns, endemic

=== Uncinia ===
Genus Uncinia:

- Uncinia lehmannii Nees, accepted as Carex uhligii K.Schum. ex C.B.Clarke, indigenous
- Uncinia spartea (Wahlenb.) Spreng. accepted as Carex spartea Wahlenb. indigenous
- Uncinia sprengelii Nees, accepted as Carex spartea Wahlenb. indigenous

=== Websteria ===
Genus Websteria:

- Websteria confervoides (Poir.) S.S.Hooper, accepted as Eleocharis confervoides (Poir.) Steud.

== Eriocaulaceae ==
Family: Eriocaulaceae,

=== Eriocaulon ===
Genus Eriocaulon:

- Eriocaulon abyssinicum Hochst. indigenous
- Eriocaulon africanum Hochst. indigenous
- Eriocaulon angustisepalum H.E.Hess, accepted as Eriocaulon mutatum N.E.Br. var. angustisepalum (H.E.Hess) S.M.Phillips, present
- Eriocaulon dregei Hochst. endemic
  - Eriocaulon dregei Hochst. var. sonderianum (Korn.) Oberm. accepted as Eriocaulon sonderianum Korn. present
- Eriocaulon gilgianum Ruhland, accepted as Eriocaulon abyssinicum Hochst. present
- Eriocaulon hydrophilum Markotter, indigenous
- Eriocaulon maculatum Schinz, indigenous
- Eriocaulon mutatum N.E.Br. indigenous
  - Eriocaulon mutatum N.E.Br. var. angustisepalum (H.E.Hess) S.M.Phillips, indigenous
- Eriocaulon ruhlandii Schinz, accepted as Eriocaulon schlechteri Ruhland, present
- Eriocaulon schlechteri Ruhland, indigenous
- Eriocaulon sonderianum Korn. indigenous
- Eriocaulon transvaalicum N.E.Br. indigenous
  - Eriocaulon transvaalicum N.E.Br. subsp. tofieldifolium (Schinz) S.M.Phillips, indigenous
  - Eriocaulon transvaalicum N.E.Br. subsp. transvaalicum, indigenous

=== Syngonanthus ===
Genus Syngonanthus:

- Syngonanthus wahlbergii (Wikstr. ex Korn.) Ruhland, indigenous
  - Syngonanthus wahlbergii (Wikstr. ex Korn.) Ruhland var. wahlbergii, indigenous

== Flagellariaceae ==
Family: Flagellariaceae,

=== Flagellaria ===
Genus Flagellaria:

- Flagellaria guineensis Schumach. indigenous

== Juncaceae ==
Family: Juncaceae,

=== Juncus ===
Genus Juncus:

- Juncus acutus L. indigenous
  - Juncus acutus L. subsp. leopoldii (Parl.) Snogerup, indigenous
- Juncus bufonius L. not indigenous, naturalised
- Juncus capensis Thunb. endemic
- Juncus capillaceus Lam. not indigenous, naturalised, invasive
- Juncus capitatus Weigel, not indigenous, naturalised
- Juncus cephalotes Thunb. endemic
- Juncus dregeanus Kunth, indigenous
  - Juncus dregeanus Kunth subsp. dregeanus, indigenous
- Juncus effusus L. indigenous
- Juncus exsertus Buchenau, indigenous
  - Juncus exsertus Buchenau subsp. exsertus, accepted as Juncus exsertus Buchenau, indigenous
  - Juncus exsertus Buchenau subsp. lesuticus B.L.Burtt, accepted as Juncus exsertus Buchenau, indigenous
- Juncus imbricatus Laharpe, not indigenous, naturalised, invasive
- Juncus inaequalis Buchenau var. squarrosus Adamson, accepted as Juncus cephalotes Thunb. present
- Juncus inflexus L. indigenous
- Juncus kraussii Hochst. indigenous
  - Juncus kraussii Hochst. subsp. kraussii, indigenous
- Juncus lomatophyllus Spreng. indigenous
- Juncus mollifolius Hilliard & B.L.Burtt, accepted as Juncus dregeanus Kunth subsp. dregeanus, indigenous
- Juncus obliquus Adamson, indigenous
- Juncus oxycarpus E.Mey. ex Kunth, indigenous
- Juncus pictus Steud. endemic
- Juncus punctorius L.f. indigenous
- Juncus rigidus Desf. indigenous
- Juncus rupestris Kunth, indigenous
- Juncus scabriusculus Kunth, endemic
- Juncus sonderianus Buchenau, accepted as Juncus dregeanus Kunth subsp. dregeanus, present
- Juncus stenopetalus Adamson, endemic
- Juncus tenuis Willd. not indigenous, naturalised

=== Luzula ===
Genus Luzula:

- Luzula africana Drege ex Steud. indigenous

== Poaceae ==
Family: Poaceae, 206 genera have been recorded. Not all are necessarily currently accepted.

- Genus Achnatherum:
- Genus Acrachne:
- Genus Acroceras:
- Genus Agrostis:
- Genus Aira:
- Genus Alloteropsis:
- Genus Alopecurus:
- Genus Amelichloa:
- Genus Ammophila:
- Genus Andropogon:
- Genus Anthephora:
- Genus Anthoxanthum:
- Genus Aristida:
- Genus Arrhenatherum:
- Genus Arthratherum:
- Genus Arthraxon:
- Genus Arundinella:
- Genus Arundo:
- Genus Avena:
- Genus Axonopus:
- Genus Bambusa:
- Genus Bewsia:
- Genus Bothriochloa:
- Genus Brachiaria:
- Genus Brachychloa:
- Genus Brachypodium:
- Genus Briza:
- Genus Brizopyrum:
- Genus Bromus:
- Genus Calamagrostis:
- Genus Capeochloa:
- Genus Catalepis:
- Genus Catapodium:
- Genus Cenchrus:
- Genus Centropodia:
- Genus Chaetobromus:
- Genus Chloris: (syn. Lintonia)
- Genus Chrysopogon:
- Genus Cladoraphis:
- Genus Cleistachne:
- Genus Coelachyrum:
- Genus Coelorachis:
- Genus Coix:
- Genus Colpodium:
- Genus Cortaderia:
- Genus Corynephorus:
- Genus Craspedorhachis:
- Genus Ctenium:
- Genus Cymbopogon:
- Genus Cynodon:
- Genus Cynosurus:
- Genus Dactylis:
- Genus Dactyloctenium:
- Genus Danthonia:
- Genus Danthoniopsis:
- Genus Deschampsia:
- Genus Desmazeria:
- Genus Diandrochloa:
- Genus Dichanthium:
- Genus Digitaria:
- Genus Diheteropogon:
- Genus Dinebra:
- Genus Diplachne:
- Genus Dregeochloa:
- Genus Echinochloa:
- Genus Ehrharta:
- Genus Eleusine:
- Genus Elionurus:
- Genus Elymandra:
- Genus Elymus: (syn. Elytrigia)
- Genus Elytrophorus:
- Genus Enneapogon:
- Genus Enteropogon:
- Genus Entolasia:
- Genus Eragrostis:
- Genus Eriachne:
- Genus Eriochloa:
- Genus Eriochrysis:
- Genus Eulalia:
- Genus Eustachys:
- Genus Festuca:
- Genus Fingerhuthia:
- Genus Gastridium:
- Genus Geochloa:
- Genus Glyceria:
- Genus Gymnothrix:
- Genus Hackelochloa:
- Genus Hainardia:
- Genus Harpochloa:
- Genus Helictotrichon:
- Genus Hemarthria:
- Genus Heteropogon:
- Genus Holcus:
- Genus Hordeum:
- Genus Hyparrhenia:
- Genus Hyperthelia:
- Genus Imperata:
- Genus Ischaemum:
- Genus Karroochloa:
- Genus Koeleria:
- Genus Lagurus:
- Genus Lamarckia:
- Genus Lasiagrostis:
- Genus Lasiochloa:
- Genus Leersia:
- Genus Leptocarydion:
- Genus Leptochloa:
- Genus Lepturus:
- Genus Leucophrys:
- Genus Lolium:
- Genus Lophacme:
- Genus Lophochloa:
- Genus Loudetia:
- Genus Maltebrunia:
- Genus Megaloprotachne:
- Genus Megastachya:
- Genus Melica:
- Genus Melinis:
- Genus Merxmuellera:
- Genus Microchloa:
- Genus Microlaena:
- Genus Microstegium:
- Genus Miscanthus:
- Genus Monocymbium:
- Genus Mosdenia:
- Genus Nassella:
- Genus Nastus:
- Genus Odontelytrum:
- Genus Odyssea:
- Genus Olyra:
- Genus Oplismenus:
- Genus Oropetium:
- Genus Oryza:
- Genus Oxyrhachis:
- Genus Oxytenanthera:
- Genus Panicum:
- Genus Parapholis:
- Genus Paspalidium: (syn. of Setaria)
- Genus Paspalum:
- Genus Pennisetum:
- Genus Pentameris:
- Genus Periballia:
- Genus Perotis:
- Genus Petrina:
- Genus Phacelurus:
- Genus Phalaris:
- Genus Phragmites:
- Genus Poa:
- Genus Pogonarthria:
- Genus Polevansia:
- Genus Polypogon:
- Genus Prionanthium:
- Genus Prosphytochloa:
- Genus Pseudechinolaena:
- Genus Puccinellia:
- Genus Rendlia:
- Genus Rhytachne:
- Genus Rottboellia:
- Genus Sacciolepis:
- Genus Sartidia:
- Genus Sasa:
- Genus Schismus:
- Genus Schizachyrium:
- Genus Schmidtia:
- Genus Schoenefeldiella:
- Genus Sclerochloa:
- Genus Secale:
- Genus Sehima:
- Genus Setaria:
- Genus Sorghastrum:
- Genus Sorghum:
- Genus Spartina:
- Genus Sphenopus:
- Genus Sporobolus:
- Genus Steinchisma:
- Genus Stenotaphrum:
- Genus Stereochlaena:
- Genus Stiburus:
- Genus Stipa:
- Genus Stipagrostis:
- Genus Streblochaete:
- Genus Styppeiochloa:
- Genus Tarigidia:
- Genus Tenaxia:
- Genus Tetrachne:
- Genus Tetrapogon:
- Genus Thamnocalamus:
- Genus Themeda:
- Genus Thinopyrum:
- Genus Trachypogon:
- Genus Tragus:
- Genus Tribolium:
- Genus Tricholaena:
- Genus Trichoneura:
- Genus Trichopteryx:
- Genus Tripogon:
- Genus Triraphis:
- Genus Tristachya:
- Genus Urelytrum:
- Genus Urochlaena:
- Genus Urochloa:
- Genus Vetiveria:
- Genus Vulpia:

== Restionaceae ==
Family: Restionaceae,

=== Anthochortus ===
Genus Anthochortus:

- Anthochortus capensis Esterh. endemic
- Anthochortus crinalis (Mast.) H.P.Linder, endemic
- Anthochortus ecklonii Nees, endemic
- Anthochortus graminifolius (Kunth) H.P.Linder, endemic
- Anthochortus insignis (Mast.) H.P.Linder, endemic
- Anthochortus laxiflorus (Nees) H.P.Linder, endemic
- Anthochortus singularis Esterh. endemic

=== Askidiosperma ===
Genus Askidiosperma:

- Askidiosperma albo-aristatum (Pillans) H.P.Linder, endemic
- Askidiosperma alticolum (Esterh.) H.P.Linder, endemic
- Askidiosperma andreaeanum (Pillans) H.P.Linder, endemic
- Askidiosperma capitatum Steud. endemic
- Askidiosperma chartaceum (Pillans) H.P.Linder, endemic
  - Askidiosperma chartaceum (Pillans) H.P.Linder subsp. alticolum Esterh. accepted as Askidiosperma alticolum (Esterh.) H.P.Linder, present
- Askidiosperma delicatulum H.P.Linder, endemic
- Askidiosperma esterhuyseniae (Pillans) H.P.Linder, endemic
- Askidiosperma insigne (Pillans) H.P.Linder, endemic
- Askidiosperma longiflorum (Pillans) H.P.Linder, endemic
- Askidiosperma nitidum (Mast.) H.P.Linder, endemic
- Askidiosperma paniculatum (Mast.) H.P.Linder, endemic
- Askidiosperma rugosum Esterh. endemic

=== Calopsis ===
Genus Calopsis:

- Calopsis adpressa Esterh. accepted as Restio adpressus (Esterh.) H.P.Linder & C.R.Hardy, endemic
- Calopsis andreaeana (Pillans) H.P.Linder, accepted as Restio andreaeanus (Pillans) H.P.Linder & C.R.Hardy, endemic
- Calopsis aspera (Mast.) H.P.Linder, accepted as Restio asperus (Mast.) H.P.Linder & C.R.Hardy, endemic
- Calopsis burchellii (Mast.) H.P.Linder, accepted as Restio albotuberculatus H.P.Linder & C.R.Hardy, endemic
- Calopsis clandestina Esterh. accepted as Restio clandestinus (Esterh.) H.P.Linder & C.R.Hardy, endemic
- Calopsis dura Esterh. accepted as Restio durus (Esterh.) H.P.Linder & C.R.Hardy, endemic
- Calopsis esterhuyseniae (Pillans) H.P.Linder, accepted as Restio distylis H.P.Linder & C.R.Hardy, endemic
- Calopsis filiformis (Mast.) H.P.Linder, accepted as Restio tenuispicatus H.P.Linder & C.R.Hardy, endemic
- Calopsis fruticosa (Mast.) H.P.Linder, accepted as Restio calcicola H.P.Linder & C.R.Hardy, endemic
- Calopsis gracilis (Mast.) H.P.Linder, accepted as Restio ramosissimus H.P.Linder & C.R.Hardy, endemic
- Calopsis hyalina (Mast.) H.P.Linder, accepted as Restio hyalinus (Mast.) H.P.Linder & C.R.Hardy, endemic
- Calopsis impolita (Kunth) H.P.Linder, accepted as Restio impolitus Kunth, endemic
- Calopsis levynsiae (Pillans) H.P.Linder, accepted as Restio levynsiae (Pillans) H.P.Linder & C.R.Hardy, endemic
- Calopsis marlothii (Pillans) H.P.Linder, accepted as Restio rudolfii (Pillans) H.P.Linder & C.R.Hardy, endemic
- Calopsis membranacea (Pillans) H.P.Linder, accepted as Restio parvispiculus H.P.Linder & C.R.Hardy, endemic
- Calopsis monostylis (Pillans) H.P.Linder, accepted as Restio monostylis (Pillans) H.P.Linder & C.R.Hardy, endemic
- Calopsis muirii (Pillans) H.P.Linder, accepted as Restio muirii (Pillans) H.P.Linder & C.R.Hardy, endemic
- Calopsis nudiflora (Pillans) H.P.Linder, accepted as Restio nudiflorus (Pillans) H.P.Linder & C.R.Hardy, endemic
- Calopsis paniculata (Rottb.) Desv. accepted as Restio paniculatus Rottb. endemic
- Calopsis pulchra Esterh. accepted as Restio pulcher (Esterh.) H.P.Linder & C.R.Hardy, endemic
- Calopsis rigida (Mast.) H.P.Linder, accepted as Restio rigidus (Mast.) H.P.Linder & C.R.Hardy, endemic
- Calopsis rigorata (Mast.) H.P.Linder, accepted as Restio rigoratus (Mast.) H.P.Linder & C.R.Hardy, endemic
- Calopsis sparsa Esterh. accepted as Restio villosus H.P.Linder & C.R.Hardy, endemic
- Calopsis viminea (Rottb.) H.P.Linder, accepted as Restio vimineus Rottb. endemic

=== Cannomois ===
Genus Cannomois:

- Cannomois anfracta H.P.Linder, endemic
- Cannomois arenicola H.P.Linder, endemic
- Cannomois aristata Mast. endemic
- Cannomois congesta Mast. endemic
- Cannomois grandis H.P.Linder, endemic
- Cannomois nitida (Mast.) Pillans, endemic
- Cannomois parviflora (Thunb.) Pillans, endemic
- Cannomois primosii (Pillans) H.P.Linder, endemic
- Cannomois robusta (Kunth) H.P.Linder, endemic
- Cannomois saundersii Mujaju, accepted as Cannomois robusta (Kunth) H.P.Linder, endemic
- Cannomois schlechteri Mast. endemic
- Cannomois scirpoides (Kunth) Mast. endemic
- Cannomois spicata Mast. endemic
- Cannomois taylorii H.P.Linder, accepted as Cannomois schlechteri Mast. present
- Cannomois virgata (Rottb.) Steud. endemic

=== Ceratocaryum ===
Genus Ceratocaryum:

- Ceratocaryum argenteum Kunth, endemic
- Ceratocaryum caespitosum H.P.Linder, endemic
- Ceratocaryum decipiens (N.E.Br.) H.P.Linder, endemic
- Ceratocaryum fimbriatum (Kunth) H.P.Linder, endemic
- Ceratocaryum fistulosum Mast. endemic
- Ceratocaryum persistens H.P.Linder, endemic
- Ceratocaryum pulchrum H.P.Linder, endemic
- Ceratocaryum xerophilum (Pillans) H.P.Linder, endemic

=== Chondropetalum ===
Genus Chondropetalum:

- Chondropetalum acockii Pillans, accepted as Elegia acockii (Pillans) Moline & H.P.Linder, endemic
- Chondropetalum aggregatum (Mast.) Pillans, accepted as Elegia aggregata (Mast.) Moline & H.P.Linder, endemic
- Chondropetalum decipiens Esterh. accepted as Elegia decipiens (Esterh.) Moline & H.P.Linder, endemic
- Chondropetalum deustum Rottb. accepted as Elegia deusta (Rottb.) Kunth, endemic
- Chondropetalum ebracteatum (Kunth) Pillans, accepted as Elegia ebracteata (Kunth) Moline & H.P.Linder, endemic
- Chondropetalum hookerianum (Mast.) Pillans, accepted as Elegia hookeriana (Mast.) Moline & H.P.Linder, endemic
- Chondropetalum marlothii (Pillans) Pillans, accepted as Elegia marlothii (Pillans) Moline & H.P.Linder, endemic
- Chondropetalum microcarpum (Kunth) Pillans, accepted as Elegia microcarpa (Kunth) Moline & H.P.Linder, endemic
- Chondropetalum mucronatum (Nees) Pillans, accepted as Elegia mucronata (Nees) Kunth, endemic
- Chondropetalum nudum Rottb. accepted as Elegia nuda (Rottb.) Kunth, endemic
- Chondropetalum rectum (Mast.) Pillans, accepted as Elegia recta (Mast.) Moline & H.P.Linder, endemic
- Chondropetalum tectorum (L.f.) Raf. accepted as Elegia tectorum (L.f.) Moline & H.P.Linder, endemic

=== Dovea ===
Genus Dovea:

- Dovea macrocarpa Kunth, accepted as Elegia macrocarpa (Kunth) Moline & H.P.Linder, endemic

=== Elegia ===
Genus Elegia:

- Elegia acockii (Pillans) Moline & H.P.Linder, endemic
- Elegia aggregata (Mast.) Moline & H.P.Linder, endemic
- Elegia altigena Pillans, endemic
- Elegia amoena Pillans, endemic
- Elegia asperiflora (Nees) Kunth, endemic
- Elegia atratiflora Esterh. endemic
- Elegia caespitosa Esterh. endemic
- Elegia capensis (Burm.f.) Schelpe, endemic
- Elegia coleura Mast. endemic
- Elegia cuspidata Mast. endemic
- Elegia decipiens (Esterh.) Moline & H.P.Linder, endemic
- Elegia deusta (Rottb.) Kunth, endemic
- Elegia dregeana Kunth, accepted as Elegia asperiflora (Nees) Kunth, present
- Elegia ebracteata (Kunth) Moline & H.P.Linder, endemic
- Elegia elephantina H.P.Linder, endemic
- Elegia equisetacea Mast. endemic
- Elegia esterhuyseniae Pillans, endemic
- Elegia extensa Pillans, endemic
- Elegia fastigiata Mast. endemic
- Elegia fenestrata Pillans, endemic
- Elegia filacea Mast. endemic
- Elegia fistulosa Kunth, endemic
- Elegia fucata Esterh. endemic
- Elegia galpinii N.E.Br. endemic
- Elegia grandis (Nees) Kunth, endemic
- Elegia grandispicata H.P.Linder, endemic
- Elegia hookeriana (Mast.) Moline & H.P.Linder, endemic
- Elegia hutchinsonii Pillans, endemic
- Elegia intermedia (Steud.) Pillans, endemic
- Elegia juncea L. endemic
- Elegia macrocarpa (Kunth) Moline & H.P.Linder, endemic
- Elegia marlothii (Pillans) Moline & H.P.Linder, endemic
- Elegia microcarpa (Kunth) Moline & H.P.Linder, endemic
- Elegia mucronata (Nees) Kunth, endemic
- Elegia muirii Pillans, endemic
- Elegia namaquense H.P.Linder & Helme, endemic
- Elegia neesii Mast. endemic
- Elegia nuda (Rottb.) Kunth, endemic
- Elegia persistens Mast. endemic
- Elegia prominens Pillans, endemic
- Elegia racemosa (Poir.) Pers. endemic
- Elegia recta (Mast.) Moline & H.P.Linder, endemic
- Elegia rigida Mast. endemic
- Elegia spathacea Mast. endemic
- Elegia squamosa Mast. endemic
- Elegia stipularis Mast. endemic
- Elegia stokoei Pillans, endemic
- Elegia tectorum (L.f.) Moline & H.P.Linder, endemic
- Elegia thyrsifera (Rottb.) Pers. endemic
- Elegia thyrsoidea (Mast.) Pillans, endemic
- Elegia vaginulata Mast. endemic
- Elegia verreauxii Mast. endemic

=== Hydrophilus ===
Genus Hydrophilus:

- Hydrophilus rattrayi (Pillans) H.P.Linder, endemic

=== Hypodiscus ===
Genus Hypodiscus:

- Hypodiscus albo-aristatus (Nees) Mast. endemic
- Hypodiscus alternans Pillans, endemic
- Hypodiscus argenteus (Thunb.) Mast. endemic
- Hypodiscus aristatus (Thunb.) C.Krauss, endemic
- Hypodiscus laevigatus (Kunth) H.P.Linder, endemic
- Hypodiscus montanus Esterh. endemic
- Hypodiscus neesii Mast. endemic
- Hypodiscus procurrens Esterh. endemic
- Hypodiscus rigidus Mast. endemic
- Hypodiscus rugosus Mast. endemic
- Hypodiscus squamosus Esterh. endemic
- Hypodiscus striatus (Kunth) Mast. endemic
- Hypodiscus sulcatus Pillans, endemic
- Hypodiscus synchroolepis (Steud.) Mast. endemic
- Hypodiscus willdenowia (Nees) Mast. endemic

=== Ischyrolepis ===
Genus Ischyrolepis:

- Ischyrolepis affinis Esterh. accepted as Restio affinis (Esterh.) H.P.Linder & C.R.Hardy, endemic
- Ischyrolepis arida (Pillans) H.P.Linder, accepted as Restio aridus Pillans, endemic
- Ischyrolepis caespitosa Esterh. accepted as Restio caespitosus (Esterh.) H.P.Linder & C.R.Hardy, endemic
- Ischyrolepis capensis (L.) H.P.Linder, accepted as Restio capensis (L.) H.P.Linder & C.R.Hardy, endemic
- Ischyrolepis cincinnata (Mast.) H.P.Linder, accepted as Restio cincinnatus Mast. endemic
- Ischyrolepis coactilis (Mast.) H.P.Linder, accepted as Restio coactilis Mast. endemic
- Ischyrolepis curvibracteata Esterh. accepted as Restio curvibracteatus (Esterh.) H.P.Linder & C.R.Hardy, endemic
- Ischyrolepis curviramis (Kunth) H.P.Linder, accepted as Restio curviramis Kunth, endemic
- Ischyrolepis distracta (Mast.) H.P.Linder, accepted as Restio distractus Mast. endemic
- Ischyrolepis duthieae (Pillans) H.P.Linder, accepted as Restio duthieae Pillans, endemic
- Ischyrolepis eleocharis (Mast.) H.P.Linder, accepted as Restio eleocharis Mast. endemic
- Ischyrolepis esterhuyseniae (Pillans) H.P.Linder, accepted as Restio esterhuyseniae Pillans, endemic
- Ischyrolepis feminea Esterh. accepted as Restio femineus (Esterh.) H.P.Linder & C.R.Hardy, endemic
- Ischyrolepis fraterna (Kunth) H.P.Linder, accepted as Restio fraternus Kunth, endemic
- Ischyrolepis fuscidula (Pillans) H.P.Linder, accepted as Restio fuscidulus Pillans, endemic
- Ischyrolepis gaudichaudiana (Kunth) H.P.Linder, accepted as Restio gaudichaudianus Kunth, endemic
  - Ischyrolepis gaudichaudiana (Kunth) H.P.Linder var. luxurians Pillans, accepted as Restio luxurians (Pillans) H.P.Linder, endemic
- Ischyrolepis gossypina (Mast.) H.P.Linder, accepted as Restio gossypinus Mast. endemic
- Ischyrolepis helenae (Mast.) H.P.Linder, accepted as Restio helenae Mast. endemic
- Ischyrolepis hystrix (Mast.) H.P.Linder, accepted as Restio hystrix Mast. endemic
- Ischyrolepis karooica Esterh. accepted as Restio karooicus (Esterh.) H.P.Linder & C.R.Hardy, endemic
- Ischyrolepis laniger (Kunth) H.P.Linder, accepted as Restio laniger Kunth, endemic
- Ischyrolepis leptoclados (Mast.) H.P.Linder, accepted as Restio leptoclados Mast. endemic
- Ischyrolepis longiaristata H.P.Linder, accepted as Restio longiaristatus (Pillans ex H.P.Linder) H.P.Linder & C.R.Hardy, endemic
- Ischyrolepis macer (Kunth) H.P.Linder, accepted as Restio macer Kunth, endemic
- Ischyrolepis marlothii (Pillans) H.P.Linder, accepted as Restio marlothii Pillans, endemic
- Ischyrolepis monanthos (Mast.) H.P.Linder, accepted as Restio monanthos Mast. endemic
- Ischyrolepis nana Esterh. accepted as Restio nanus (Esterh.) H.P.Linder & C.R.Hardy, endemic
- Ischyrolepis nubigena Esterh. accepted as Restio nubigenus (Esterh.) H.P.Linder & C.R.Hardy, endemic
- Ischyrolepis ocreata (Kunth) H.P.Linder, accepted as Restio ocreatus Kunth, endemic
- Ischyrolepis paludosa (Pillans) H.P.Linder, accepted as Restio paludosus Pillans, endemic
- Ischyrolepis papillosa Esterh. accepted as Restio papillosus (Esterh.) H.P.Linder & C.R.Hardy, endemic
- Ischyrolepis pratensis Esterh. accepted as Restio pratensis (Esterh.) H.P.Linder & C.R.Hardy, endemic
- Ischyrolepis pygmaea (Pillans) H.P.Linder, accepted as Restio pygmaeus Pillans, endemic
- Ischyrolepis rivula Esterh. accepted as Restio rivulus (Esterh.) H.P.Linder & C.R.Hardy, endemic
- Ischyrolepis rottboellioides (Kunth) H.P.Linder, accepted as Restio rottboellioides Kunth, endemic
- Ischyrolepis sabulosa (Pillans) H.P.Linder, accepted as Restio sabulosus Pillans, endemic
- Ischyrolepis saxatilis Esterh. accepted as Restio saxatilis (Esterh.) H.P.Linder & C.R.Hardy, endemic
- Ischyrolepis schoenoides (Kunth) H.P.Linder, accepted as Restio schoenoides Kunth, indigenous
- Ischyrolepis setiger (Kunth) H.P.Linder, accepted as Restio setiger Kunth, endemic
- Ischyrolepis sieberi (Kunth) H.P.Linder, accepted as Restio sieberi Kunth, endemic
- Ischyrolepis sporadica Esterh. accepted as Restio sporadicus (Esterh.) H.P.Linder & C.R.Hardy, endemic
- Ischyrolepis subverticillata Steud. accepted as Restio subverticillatus (Steud.) Mast. endemic
- Ischyrolepis tenuissima (Kunth) H.P.Linder, accepted as Restio tenuissimus Kunth, endemic
- Ischyrolepis triflora (Rottb.) H.P.Linder, accepted as Restio triflora Rottb. endemic
- Ischyrolepis unispicata H.P.Linder, accepted as Restio unispicatus (H.P.Linder) H.P.Linder & C.R.Hardy, endemic
- Ischyrolepis venustulus (Kunth) H.P.Linder, accepted as Restio venustulus Kunth, endemic
- Ischyrolepis vilis (Kunth) H.P.Linder, accepted as Restio vilis Kunth, endemic
- Ischyrolepis virgea (Mast.) H.P.Linder, accepted as Restio venustulus Kunth, endemic
- Ischyrolepis wallichii (Mast.) H.P.Linder, accepted as Restio wallichii Mast. endemic
- Ischyrolepis wittebergensis Esterh. accepted as Restio wittebergensis (Esterh.) H.P.Linder & C.R.Hardy, endemic

=== Mastersiella ===
Genus Mastersiella:

- Mastersiella digitata (Thunb.) Gilg-Ben. endemic
- Mastersiella purpurea (Pillans) H.P.Linder, endemic
- Mastersiella spathulata (Pillans) H.P.Linder, endemic

=== Nevillea ===
Genus Nevillea:

- Nevillea obtusissima (Steud.) H.P.Linder, endemic
- Nevillea singularis Esterh. endemic
- Nevillea vlokii H.P.Linder, endemic

=== Platycaulos ===
Genus Platycaulos:

- Platycaulos acutus Esterh. endemic
- Platycaulos anceps (Mast.) H.P.Linder, endemic
- Platycaulos callistachyus (Kunth) H.P.Linder, endemic
- Platycaulos cascadensis (Pillans) H.P.Linder, endemic
- Platycaulos compressus (Rottb.) H.P.Linder, endemic
- Platycaulos depauperatus (Kunth) H.P.Linder, endemic
- Platycaulos galpinii (Pillans) H.P.Linder & C.R.Hardy, endemic
- Platycaulos major (Mast.) H.P.Linder, endemic
- Platycaulos subcompressus (Pillans) H.P.Linder, endemic

=== Restio ===
Genus Restio:

- Restio acockii Pillans, endemic
- Restio adpressus (Esterh.) H.P.Linder & C.R.Hardy, endemic
- Restio affinis (Esterh.) H.P.Linder & C.R.Hardy, endemic
- Restio albotuberculatus H.P.Linder & C.R.Hardy, endemic
- Restio alticola Pillans, endemic
- Restio ambiguus Mast. accepted as Soroveta ambigua (Mast.) H.P.Linder & C.R.Hardy, endemic
- Restio andreaeanus (Pillans) H.P.Linder & C.R.Hardy, endemic
- Restio anomalus H.P.Linder, endemic
- Restio arcuatus Mast. endemic
- Restio aridus Pillans, endemic
- Restio asperus (Mast.) H.P.Linder & C.R.Hardy, endemic
- Restio aureolus Pillans, endemic
- Restio bifarius Mast. endemic
- Restio bifidus Thunb. endemic
- Restio bifurcus Nees ex Mast. endemic
- Restio bolusii Pillans, endemic
- Restio brachiatus (Mast.) Pillans, endemic
- Restio brunneus Pillans, endemic
- Restio burchellii Pillans, endemic
- Restio caespitosus (Esterh.) H.P.Linder & C.R.Hardy, endemic
- Restio calcicola H.P.Linder & C.R.Hardy, endemic
- Restio capensis (L.) H.P.Linder & C.R.Hardy, endemic
- Restio capillaris Kunth, endemic
- Restio cedarbergensis H.P.Linder, endemic
- Restio cincinnatus Mast. endemic
- Restio clandestinus (Esterh.) H.P.Linder & C.R.Hardy, endemic
- Restio coactilis Mast. endemic
- Restio colliculospermus H.P.Linder, endemic
- Restio communis Pillans, endemic
- Restio confusus Pillans, endemic
- Restio constipatus H.P.Linder, endemic
- Restio corneolus Esterh. endemic
- Restio curvibracteatus (Esterh.) H.P.Linder & C.R.Hardy, endemic
- Restio curviramis Kunth, endemic
- Restio cymosus (Mast.) Pillans, endemic
- Restio debilis Nees, endemic
- Restio decipiens (N.E.Br.) H.P.Linder, endemic
- Restio degenerans Pillans, endemic
- Restio dispar Mast. endemic
- Restio distans Pillans, endemic
- Restio distichus Rottb. endemic
- Restio distractus Mast. endemic
- Restio distylis H.P.Linder & C.R.Hardy, endemic
- Restio dodii Pillans [9], indigenous
  - Restio dodii Pillans var. dodii, endemic
  - Restio dodii Pillans var. purpureus Pillans, endemic
- Restio durus (Esterh.) H.P.Linder & C.R.Hardy, endemic
- Restio duthieae Pillans, endemic
- Restio echinatus Kunth, endemic
- Restio egregius Hochst. endemic
- Restio ejuncidus Mast. endemic
- Restio eleocharis Mast. endemic
- Restio elsieae H.P.Linder, endemic
- Restio esterhuyseniae Pillans, endemic
- Restio exilis Mast. accepted as Restio bifidus Thunb. present
- Restio femineus (Esterh.) H.P.Linder & C.R.Hardy, endemic
- Restio festuciformis Nees ex Mast. endemic
- Restio filicaulis Pillans, accepted as Restio pedicellatus Mast. present
- Restio filiformis Poir. endemic
- Restio fourcadei Pillans, accepted as Restio scaberulus N.E.Br. present
- Restio fragilis Esterh. endemic
- Restio fraternus Kunth, endemic
- Restio fuscidulus Pillans, endemic
- Restio fusiformis Pillans, endemic
- Restio galpinii Pillans, accepted as Platycaulos galpinii (Pillans) H.P.Linder & C.R.Hardy, indigenous
- Restio gaudichaudianus Kunth, endemic
- Restio gossypinus Mast. endemic
- Restio harveyi Mast. endemic
- Restio helenae Mast. endemic
- Restio hyalinus (Mast.) H.P.Linder & C.R.Hardy, endemic
- Restio hystrix Mast. endemic
- Restio implicatus Esterh. endemic
- Restio impolitus Kunth, endemic
- Restio inconspicuus Esterh. endemic
- Restio ingens Esterh. endemic
- Restio insignis Pillans, endemic
- Restio inveteratus Esterh. endemic
- Restio involutus Pillans, accepted as Restio purpurascens Nees ex Mast. endemic
- Restio karooicus (Esterh.) H.P.Linder & C.R.Hardy, endemic
- Restio laniger Kunth, endemic
- Restio leptostachyus Kunth, endemic
- Restio levynsiae (Pillans) H.P.Linder & C.R.Hardy, endemic
- Restio longiaristatus (Pillans ex H.P.Linder) H.P.Linder & C.R.Hardy, endemic
- Restio luxurians (Pillans) H.P.Linder, endemic
- Restio macer Kunth, endemic
- Restio marlothii Pillans, endemic
- Restio micans Nees, endemic
- Restio miser Kunth, endemic
- Restio mkambatiae H.P.Linder, endemic
- Restio monanthos Mast. endemic
- Restio monostylis (Pillans) H.P.Linder & C.R.Hardy, endemic
- Restio montanus Esterh. endemic
- Restio muirii (Pillans) H.P.Linder & C.R.Hardy, endemic
- Restio multiflorus Spreng. endemic
- Restio nanus (Esterh.) H.P.Linder & C.R.Hardy, endemic
- Restio nodosus Pillans, endemic
- Restio nubigenus (Esterh.) H.P.Linder & C.R.Hardy, endemic
- Restio nudiflorus (Pillans) H.P.Linder & C.R.Hardy, endemic
- Restio nuwebergensis Esterh. endemic
- Restio obscurus Pillans, endemic
- Restio occultus (Mast.) Pillans, endemic
- Restio ocreatus Kunth, endemic
- Restio pachystachyus Kunth, endemic
- Restio paludicola H.P.Linder, endemic
- Restio paludosus Pillans, endemic
- Restio paniculatus Rottb. endemic
- Restio papillosus (Esterh.) H.P.Linder & C.R.Hardy, endemic
- Restio papyraceus Pillans, endemic
- Restio parthenocarpos H.P.Linder, endemic
- Restio parviflorus Thunb. accepted as Cannomois parviflora (Thunb.) Pillans, present
- Restio parvispiculus H.P.Linder & C.R.Hardy, endemic
- Restio patens Mast. endemic
- Restio peculiaris Esterh. endemic
- Restio pedicellatus Mast. endemic
- Restio perplexus Kunth, endemic
- Restio perseverans Esterh. endemic
- Restio pillansii H.P.Linder, endemic
- Restio praeacutus Mast. endemic
- Restio pratensis (Esterh.) H.P.Linder & C.R.Hardy, endemic
- Restio pulcher (Esterh.) H.P.Linder & C.R.Hardy, endemic
- Restio pulvinatus Esterh. endemic
- Restio pumilis Esterh. endemic
- Restio purpurascens Nees ex Mast. endemic
- Restio pygmaeus Pillans, endemic
- Restio quadratus Mast. endemic
- Restio quinquefarius Nees, endemic
- Restio ramosissimus H.P.Linder & C.R.Hardy, endemic
- Restio rarus Esterh. endemic
- Restio rigidus (Mast.) H.P.Linder & C.R.Hardy, endemic
- Restio rigoratus (Mast.) H.P.Linder & C.R.Hardy, endemic
- Restio rivulus (Esterh.) H.P.Linder & C.R.Hardy, endemic
- Restio rottboellioides Kunth, endemic
- Restio rudolfii (Pillans) H.P.Linder & C.R.Hardy, endemic
- Restio rupicola Esterh. endemic
- Restio sabulosus Pillans, endemic
- Restio saroclados Mast. endemic
- Restio saxatilis (Esterh.) H.P.Linder & C.R.Hardy, endemic
- Restio scaber Mast. endemic
- Restio scaberulus N.E.Br. endemic
- Restio schoenoides Kunth, indigenous
- Restio secundus (Pillans) H.P.Linder, endemic
- Restio sejunctus Mast. endemic
- Restio setiger Kunth, endemic
- Restio sieberi Kunth, endemic
- Restio similis Pillans, endemic
- Restio singularis Esterh. endemic
- Restio sporadicus (Esterh.) H.P.Linder & C.R.Hardy, endemic
- Restio stereocaulis Mast. endemic
- Restio stokoei Pillans, endemic
- Restio strictus N.E.Br. endemic
- Restio strobolifer Kunth, endemic
- Restio subtilis Mast. endemic
- Restio subverticillatus (Steud.) Mast. endemic
- Restio tenuispicatus H.P.Linder & C.R.Hardy, endemic
- Restio tenuissimus Kunth, endemic
- Restio tetragonus Thunb. endemic
- Restio triflora Rottb. endemic
- Restio triticeus Rottb. endemic
- Restio tuberculatus Pillans, endemic
- Restio uniflorus H.P.Linder, endemic
- Restio unispicatus (H.P.Linder) H.P.Linder & C.R.Hardy, endemic
- Restio vallis-simius H.P.Linder, endemic
- Restio venustulus Kunth, endemic
- Restio verrucosus Esterh. endemic
- Restio versatilis H.P.Linder, endemic
- Restio vilis Kunth, endemic
- Restio villosus H.P.Linder & C.R.Hardy, endemic
- Restio vimineus Rottb. endemic
- Restio virgeus Mast. endemic
- Restio wallichii Mast. endemic
- Restio wittebergensis (Esterh.) H.P.Linder & C.R.Hardy, endemic
- Restio zuluensis H.P.Linder, endemic
- Restio zwartbergensis Pillans, endemic

=== Rhodocoma ===
Genus Rhodocoma:

- Rhodocoma alpina H.P.Linder & Vlok, endemic
- Rhodocoma arida H.P.Linder & Vlok, endemic
- Rhodocoma capensis Steud. endemic
- Rhodocoma foliosa (N.E.Br.) H.P.Linder, endemic
- Rhodocoma fruticosa (Thunb.) H.P.Linder, endemic
- Rhodocoma gigantea (Kunth) H.P.Linder, endemic
- Rhodocoma gracilis H.P.Linder & Vlok, endemic
- Rhodocoma vleibergensis H.P.Linder, endemic

=== Soroveta ===
Genus Soroveta:

- Soroveta ambigua (Mast.) H.P.Linder & C.R.Hardy, endemic

=== Staberoha ===
Genus Staberoha:

- Staberoha aemula (Kunth) Pillans, endemic
- Staberoha banksii Pillans, endemic
- Staberoha cernua (L.f.) T.Durand & Schinz, endemic
- Staberoha distachyos (Rottb.) Kunth, endemic
- Staberoha multispicula Pillans, endemic
- Staberoha ornata Esterh. endemic
- Staberoha remota Pillans, endemic
- Staberoha stokoei Pillans, endemic
- Staberoha vaginata (Thunb.) Pillans, endemic

=== Thamnochortus ===
Genus Thamnochortus:

- Thamnochortus acuminatus Pillans, endemic
- Thamnochortus amoena H.P.Linder, endemic
- Thamnochortus arenarius Esterh. endemic
- Thamnochortus bachmannii Mast. endemic
- Thamnochortus cinereus H.P.Linder, endemic
- Thamnochortus dumosus Mast. endemic
- Thamnochortus ellipticus Pillans, endemic
- Thamnochortus erectus (Thunb.) Mast. endemic
- Thamnochortus fraternus Pillans, endemic
- Thamnochortus fruticosus P.J.Bergius, endemic
- Thamnochortus glaber (Mast.) Pillans, endemic
- Thamnochortus gracilis Mast. endemic
- Thamnochortus guthrieae Pillans, endemic
- Thamnochortus insignis Mast. endemic
- Thamnochortus kammanassiae H.P.Linder, endemic
- Thamnochortus karooica H.P.Linder, endemic
- Thamnochortus levynsiae Pillans, endemic
- Thamnochortus lucens (Poir.) H.P.Linder, endemic
- Thamnochortus muirii Pillans, endemic
- Thamnochortus nutans (Thunb.) Pillans, endemic
- Thamnochortus obtusus Pillans, endemic
- Thamnochortus paniculatus Mast. endemic
- Thamnochortus papyraceus Pillans, endemic
- Thamnochortus pellucidus Pillans, endemic
- Thamnochortus platypteris Kunth, endemic
- Thamnochortus pluristachyus Mast. endemic
- Thamnochortus pulcher Pillans, endemic
- Thamnochortus punctatus Pillans, endemic
- Thamnochortus rigidus Esterh. endemic
- Thamnochortus scabridus Pillans, accepted as Thamnochortus schlechteri Pillans, present
- Thamnochortus schlechteri Pillans, endemic
- Thamnochortus spicigerus (Thunb.) Spreng. endemic
- Thamnochortus sporadicus Pillans, endemic
- Thamnochortus stokoei Pillans, endemic

=== Willdenowia ===
Genus Willdenowia:

- Willdenowia affinis Pillans, endemic
- Willdenowia arescens Kunth, endemic
- Willdenowia bolusii Pillans, endemic
- Willdenowia glomerata (Thunb.) H.P.Linder, endemic
- Willdenowia humilis Mast. endemic
- Willdenowia incurvata (Thunb.) H.P.Linder, endemic
- Willdenowia pilleata H.P.Linder, indigenous
- Willdenowia purpurea Pillans, endemic
- Willdenowia rugosa Esterh. endemic
- Willdenowia stokoei Pillans, endemic
- Willdenowia sulcata Mast. endemic
- Willdenowia teres Thunb. endemic

== Thurniaceae ==
Family: Thurniaceae,

=== Prionium ===
Genus Prionium:

- Prionium serratum (L.f.) Drege ex E.Mey. endemic

== Typhaceae ==
Family: Typhaceae,

=== Typha ===
Genus Typha:

- Typha capensis (Rohrb.) N.E.Br. indigenous

== Xyridaceae ==
Family: Xyridaceae,

=== Xyris ===
Genus Xyris:

- Xyris anceps Lam. indigenous
  - Xyris anceps Lam. var. anceps, indigenous
- Xyris capensis Thunb. indigenous
- Xyris congensis Buttner, indigenous
- Xyris gerrardii N.E.Br. indigenous
- Xyris natalensis L.A.Nilsson, endemic
- Xyris obscura N.E.Br. indigenous
- Xyris rehmannii L.A.Nilsson, indigenous
- Xyris rubella Malme, indigenous
