= Cyperus indecorus =

Scientific classification
- Kingdom: Plantae
- Clade: Tracheophytes
- Clade: Angiosperms
- Clade: Monocots
- Clade: Commelinids
- Order: Poales
- Family: Cyperaceae
- Genus: Cyperus
- Species: C. indecorus

Binomial name
- Cyperus indecorus Kunth

Species of plant native to Africa

Cyperus indecorus is a species of sedge that is native Malawi, Mozambique, Eswatini, South Africa, and Namibia in southern Africa.

The species was first formally described by the botanist Carl Sigismund Kunth in 1837.

== See also ==
- List of Cyperus species
