= Cyperus owanii =

Scientific classification
- Kingdom: Plantae
- Clade: Tracheophytes
- Clade: Angiosperms
- Clade: Monocots
- Clade: Commelinids
- Order: Poales
- Family: Cyperaceae
- Genus: Cyperus
- Species: C. owanii

Binomial name
- Cyperus owanii Boeckeler

Species of sedge

Cyperus owanii is a species of sedge native to south eastern Africa, including Mozambique, South Africa, and Botswana.

The species was first formally described by the botanist Johann Otto Boeckeler in 1878.

== See also ==
- List of Cyperus species
