= Cyperus schlechteri =

Scientific classification
- Kingdom: Plantae
- Clade: Tracheophytes
- Clade: Angiosperms
- Clade: Monocots
- Clade: Commelinids
- Order: Poales
- Family: Cyperaceae
- Genus: Cyperus
- Species: C. schlechteri

Binomial name
- Cyperus schlechteri C.B.Clarke

Species of plant from Southern Africa

Cyperus schlechteri is a species of sedge that is found in Southern Africa, in the countries of Lesotho and South Africa.

The species was first formally described by the botanist Charles Baron Clarke in 1903.

== See also ==
- List of Cyperus species
