= Cyperus durus =

Scientific classification
- Kingdom: Plantae
- Clade: Tracheophytes
- Clade: Angiosperms
- Clade: Monocots
- Clade: Commelinids
- Order: Poales
- Family: Cyperaceae
- Genus: Cyperus
- Species: C. durus

Binomial name
- Cyperus durus Kunth

Species of plant native to Africa

Cyperus durus is a species of sedge that is native to southern Angola and South Africa's Cape Provinces in southern Africa.

The species was first formally described by the botanist Carl Sigismund Kunth in 1837.

== See also ==
- List of Cyperus species
