= Cyperus sexangularis =

Scientific classification
- Kingdom: Plantae
- Clade: Tracheophytes
- Clade: Angiosperms
- Clade: Monocots
- Clade: Commelinids
- Order: Poales
- Family: Cyperaceae
- Genus: Cyperus
- Species: C. sexangularis

Binomial name
- Cyperus sexangularis Nees (1835)

Synonyms
- Cyperus webbianus Steud. (1854)

Species of sedge

Cyperus sexangularis is a species of sedge that is native southern Africa, including Zimbabwe, Botswana, Namibia, Eswatini, and the Northern Provinces and Cape Provinces of South Africa.

== See also ==
- List of Cyperus species
