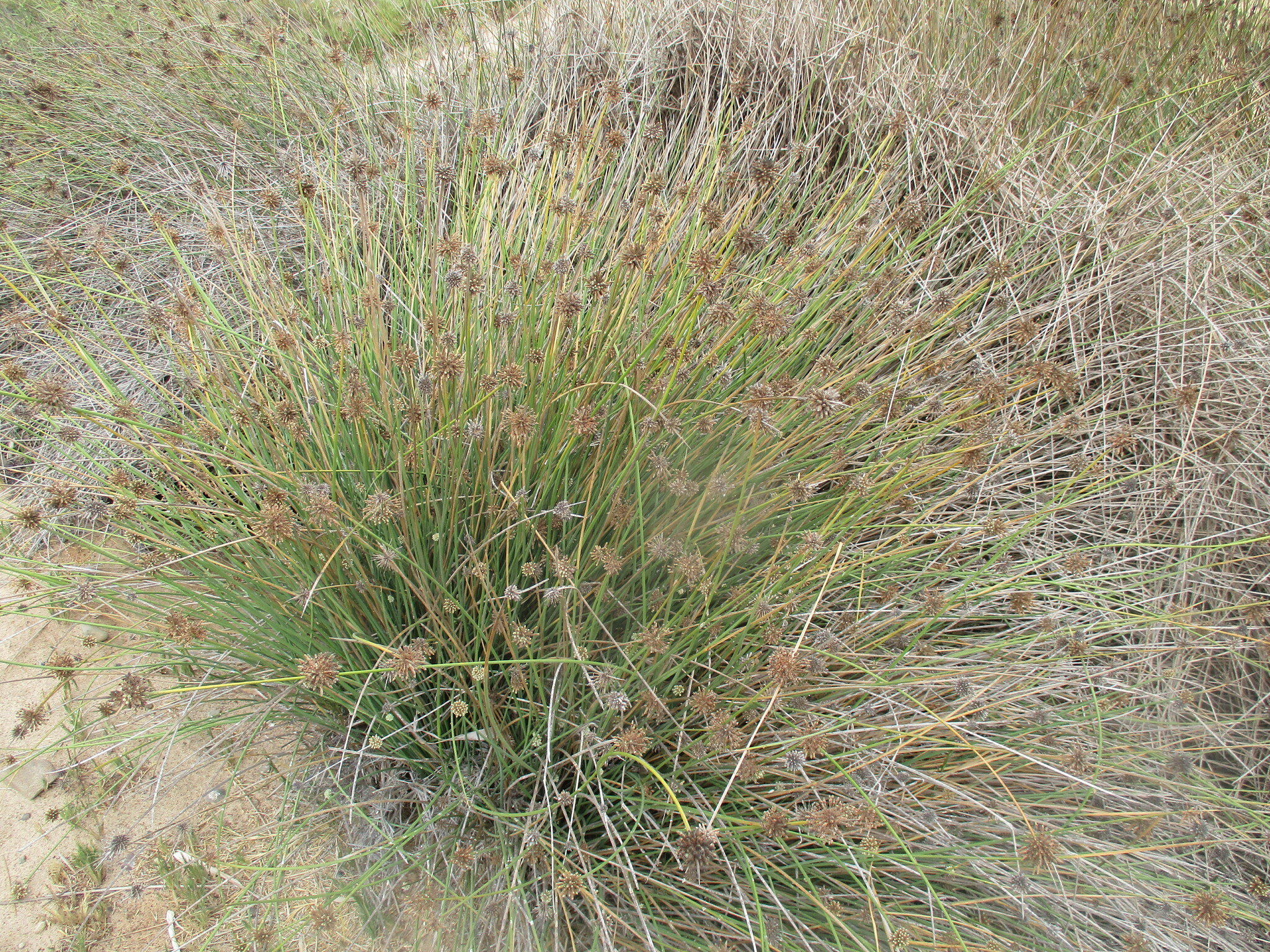
- A. dioeca

Scientific classification
- Kingdom: Plantae
- Clade: Tracheophytes
- Clade: Angiosperms
- Clade: Monocots
- Clade: Commelinids
- Order: Poales
- Family: Cyperaceae
- Genus: Afroscirpoides; García-Madr. & Muasya
- Species: A. dioeca

Binomial name
- Afroscirpoides dioeca (Kunth) García-Madr.

Synonyms
- Isolepis dioeca Kunth (1837) (basionym); Scirpoides dioeca (Kunth) Browning; Scirpus dioecus (Kunth) Boeckeler; Scirpus schinzii Boeckeler

= Afroscirpoides =

Genus of flowering plants

Afroscirpoides is a genus of flowering plants belonging to the family Cyperaceae. It includes a single species, Afroscirpoides dioeca, a perennial rhizomatous geophyte sedge native to Botswana, Namibia, and the Cape Provinces, Free State, and Northern Provinces of South Africa.
