= Carex monotropa =

Scientific classification
- Kingdom: Plantae
- Clade: Tracheophytes
- Clade: Angiosperms
- Clade: Monocots
- Clade: Commelinids
- Order: Poales
- Family: Cyperaceae
- Genus: Carex
- Species: C. monotropa

Binomial name
- Carex monotropa Nelmes

Species of grass-like plant

Carex monotropa is a sedge of the Cyperaceae family that is native to parts of Lesotho.

C. monotropa is a short, loosely tufted perennial plant with a very short rhizome. It has smooth, erect stems with a triangular cross-section that are typically 2 to 3 cm (0.79 to 1.18 in) in length and have a width of 0.5 to 1 mm (0.020 to 0.039 in). The sheathed leaves a flat or folded are usually about double the length of the stems and are 1.5 to 3 mm (0.059 to 0.118 in) wide. Three or four densely crowded spikes are found atop the stems and are 4 to 7 mm (0.16 to 0.28 in) long. It flowers in the summertime usually in January

It is commonly found in damper areas of alpine grasslands in the Drakensberg region.

== See also ==
- List of Carex species
