= Cyperus usitatus =

Scientific classification
- Kingdom: Plantae
- Clade: Tracheophytes
- Clade: Angiosperms
- Clade: Monocots
- Clade: Commelinids
- Order: Poales
- Family: Cyperaceae
- Genus: Cyperus
- Species: C. usitatus

Binomial name
- Cyperus usitatus Burch., 1824

Species of sedge

Cyperus usitatus is a species of sedge that is native to eastern and southern Africa, ranging from Ethiopia to South Africa.

== See also ==
- List of Cyperus species
