= Soroveta =

Scientific classification
- Kingdom: Plantae
- Clade: Tracheophytes
- Clade: Angiosperms
- Clade: Monocots
- Clade: Commelinids
- Order: Poales
- Family: Restionaceae
- Genus: Soroveta; H.P.Linder & C.R.Hardy
- Species: S. ambigua

Binomial name
- Soroveta ambigua (Mast.) H.P.Linder & C.R.Hardy

Synonyms
- Restio ambiguus Mast.

Genus of flowering plants

Soroveta is a monotypic genus of flowering plants belonging to the family Restionaceae. The only species is Soroveta ambigua, a perennial or rhizomatous geophyte native to the southwestern Cape Provinces of South Africa.
