= Cyperus kyllingiella =

Scientific classification
- Kingdom: Plantae
- Clade: Tracheophytes
- Clade: Angiosperms
- Clade: Monocots
- Clade: Commelinids
- Order: Poales
- Family: Cyperaceae
- Genus: Cyperus
- Species: C. kyllingiella

Binomial name
- Cyperus kyllingiella Larridon, 2011

Species of sedge

parts Cyperus kyllingiella is a species of sedge that is native to parts of the Indian subcontinent and tropical and southern parts of Africa.

== See also ==
- List of Cyperus species
