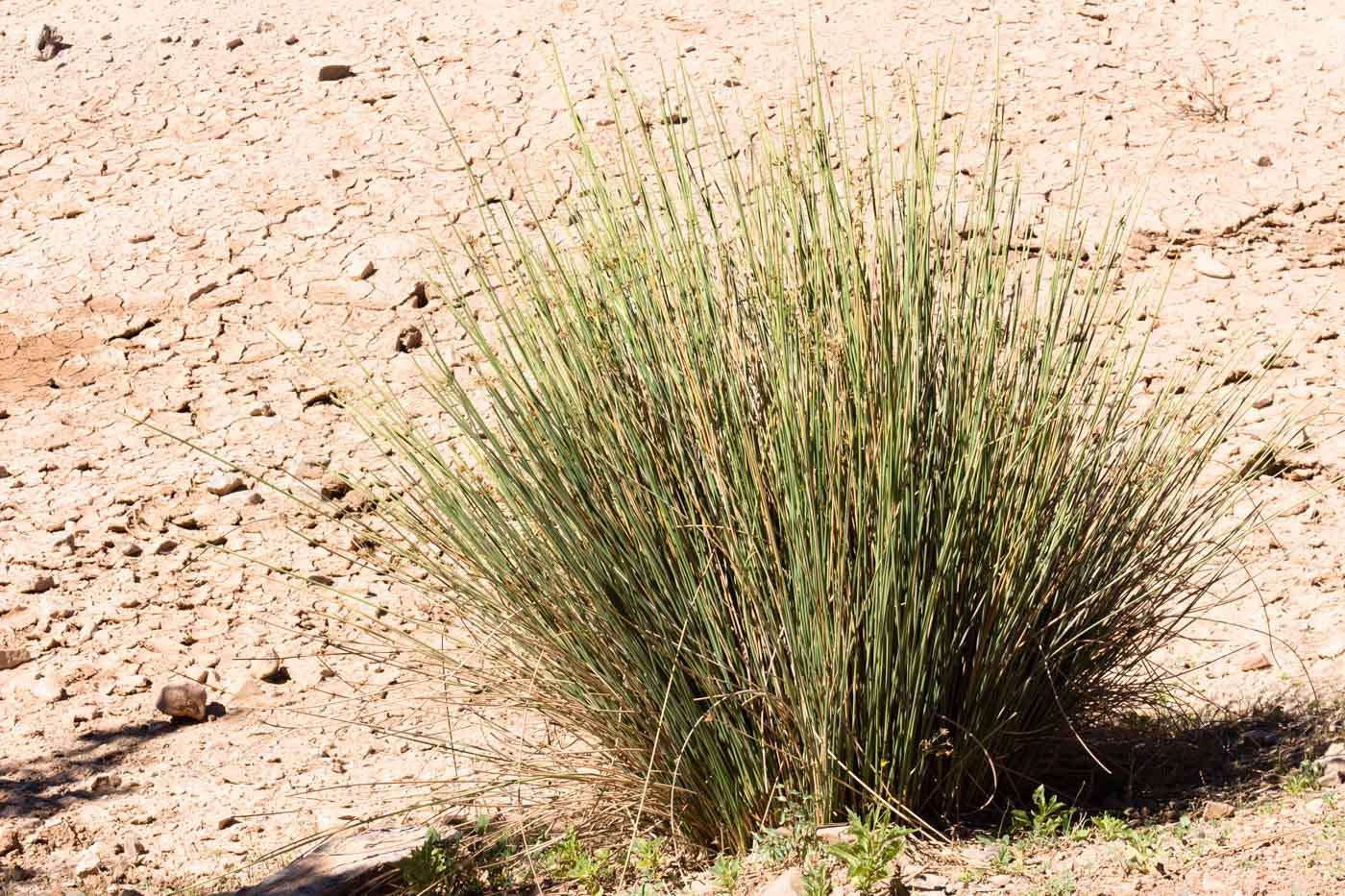
- Cyperus marginatus in 2014

Scientific classification
- Kingdom: Plantae
- Clade: Tracheophytes
- Clade: Angiosperms
- Clade: Monocots
- Clade: Commelinids
- Order: Poales
- Family: Cyperaceae
- Genus: Cyperus
- Species: C. marginatus

Binomial name
- Cyperus marginatus Thunb. (1794)

Synonyms
- Cyperus blandus Kunth (1837); Cyperus brunneovaginatus Boeckeler (1889); Cyperus fonticola Kunth (1837); Cyperus marginatus var. blandus (Kunth) Kük. (1936); Cyperus prionodes Steud. (1854); Eucyperus bruneovaginatus (Boeckeler) Rikli (1895)

= Cyperus marginatus =

Species of sedge

Cyperus marginatus is a species of sedge that is native to Angola, Namibia, Botswana, South Africa, Lesotho, and Eswatini in southern Africa, and Kenya in eastern Africa.

== See also ==
- List of Cyperus species
