= Cyperus angolensis =

Scientific classification
- Kingdom: Plantae
- Clade: Tracheophytes
- Clade: Angiosperms
- Clade: Monocots
- Clade: Commelinids
- Order: Poales
- Family: Cyperaceae
- Genus: Cyperus
- Species: C. angolensis

Binomial name
- Cyperus angolensis Boeckeler

Species of plant native to Africa

Cyperus angolensis is a species of sedge that is native to parts of Africa.

The species was first formally described by the botanist Johann Otto Boeckeler in 1880.

== See also ==
- List of Cyperus species
