= Cyperus sensilis =

Scientific classification
- Kingdom: Plantae
- Clade: Tracheophytes
- Clade: Angiosperms
- Clade: Monocots
- Clade: Commelinids
- Order: Poales
- Family: Cyperaceae
- Genus: Cyperus
- Species: C. sensilis

Binomial name
- Cyperus sensilis Baijnath, 1976

Species of sedge

Cyperus sensilis is a species of sedge that is endemic to KwaZulu-Natal in South Africa.

== See also ==
- List of Cyperus species
