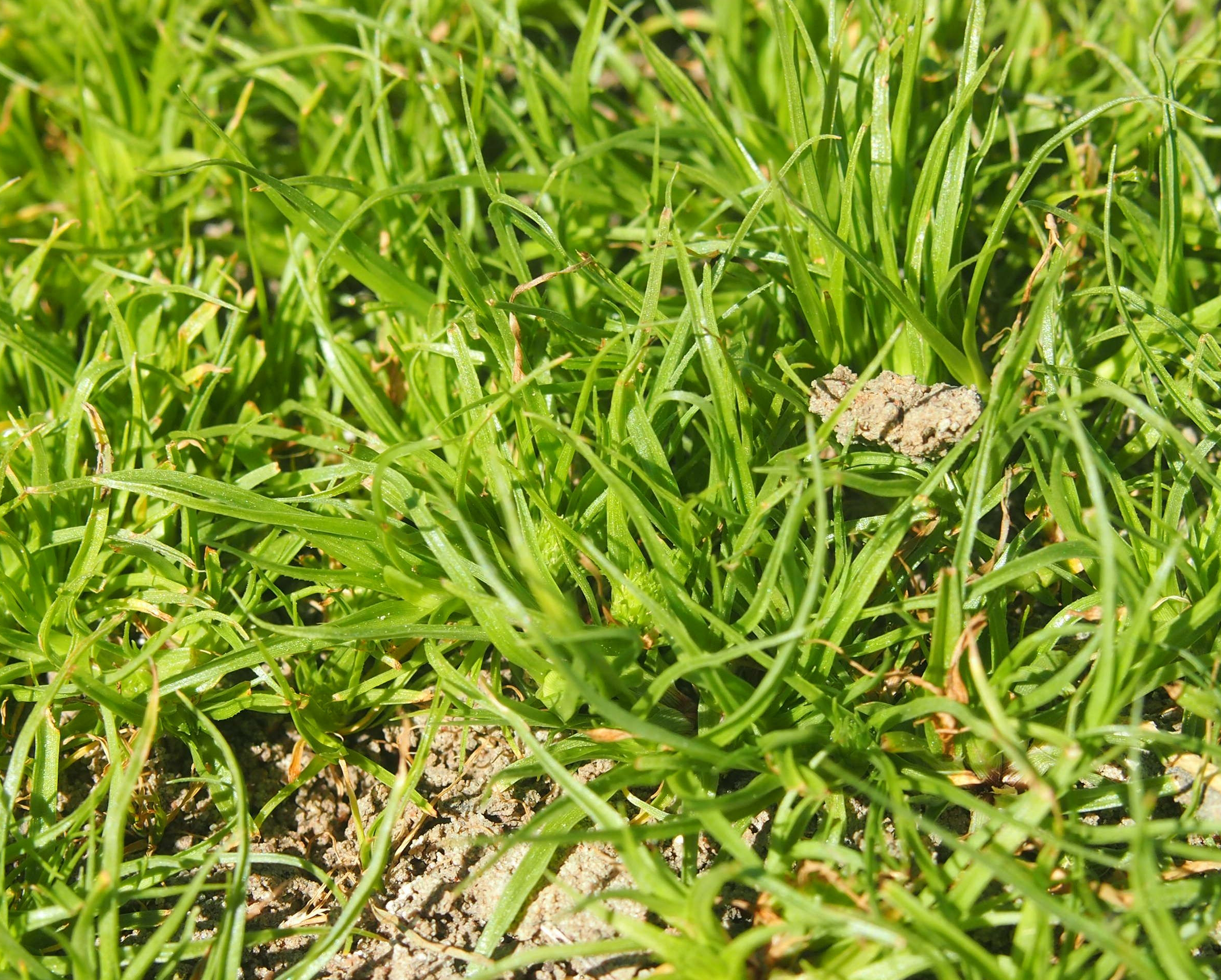
- Cyperus pygmaeus

Scientific classification
- Kingdom: Plantae
- Clade: Tracheophytes
- Clade: Angiosperms
- Clade: Monocots
- Clade: Commelinids
- Order: Poales
- Family: Cyperaceae
- Genus: Cyperus
- Species: C. pygmaeus

Binomial name
- Cyperus pygmaeus Rottb.

= Cyperus pygmaeus =

Dwarf flat sedge

Species of plant

Cyperus pygmaeus, also known as dwarf flat sedge, is a sedge of the family Cyperaceae that is native to Australia.

== Description ==
The spreading to prostrate annual herb sedge typically grows to a height of 5 centimetres (1.97 in). It has reddish coloured roots and smooth, triquetrous culms that are 1 to 20 cm (0.39 to 7.87 in) in height and with a diameter of 1.5 mm (0.059 in). The leaves are most often no longer than the culms. It blooms between July and August in warmer climates but later into summer around January in cooler climates producing green-brown flowers.

== Taxonomy ==
The species was first described in 1773 by Christen Friis Rottbøll as part of the work Descriptionum et Iconum Rariores et pro maxima parte novas plantas. The only other synonyms are Juncellus pygmaeus and Cyperus michelianus subsp. pygmaeus.

== Distribution ==
It is found in most Australian mainland states and territories including Western Australia, Northern Territory, South Australia, Queensland, New South Wales and Victoria. In Western Australia it is found along stream and creeks and around clay pans in the Pilbara and Kimberley regions where it grows in loamy-silty soils.

== See also ==
- List of Cyperus species
