= Cyperus leptocladus =

Scientific classification
- Kingdom: Plantae
- Clade: Tracheophytes
- Clade: Angiosperms
- Clade: Monocots
- Clade: Commelinids
- Order: Poales
- Family: Cyperaceae
- Genus: Cyperus
- Species: C. leptocladus

Binomial name
- Cyperus leptocladus Kunth

Species of plant native to southern Africa

Cyperus leptocladus is a species of sedge that is native to parts of Mozambique, Eswatini, South Africa, and Botswana in southern Africa.

The species was first formally described by the botanist Carl Sigismund Kunth in 1837.

== See also ==
- List of Cyperus species
