= Cyperus thunbergii =

Scientific classification
- Kingdom: Plantae
- Clade: Tracheophytes
- Clade: Angiosperms
- Clade: Monocots
- Clade: Commelinids
- Order: Poales
- Family: Cyperaceae
- Genus: Cyperus
- Species: C. thunbergii

Binomial name
- Cyperus thunbergii Vahl

Species of sedge

Cyperus thunbergii is a species of sedge that is native to the Cape Provinces of South Africa.

The species was first formally described by the botanist Martin Vahl in 1805.

== See also ==
- List of Cyperus species
