= Cyperus solidus =

Scientific classification
- Kingdom: Plantae
- Clade: Tracheophytes
- Clade: Angiosperms
- Clade: Monocots
- Clade: Commelinids
- Order: Poales
- Family: Cyperaceae
- Genus: Cyperus
- Species: C. solidus

Binomial name
- Cyperus solidus Kunth (1837)

Synonyms
- Mariscus solidus (Kunth) Vorster (1986)

Species of plant native to Africa

Cyperus solidus is a species of sedge that is native to Mozambique, Eswatini, South Africa, and Zimbabwe in southern Africa.

The species was first formally described by the botanist Carl Sigismund Kunth in 1837.

== See also ==
- List of Cyperus species
