= Cyperus marlothii =

Scientific classification
- Kingdom: Plantae
- Clade: Tracheophytes
- Clade: Angiosperms
- Clade: Monocots
- Clade: Commelinids
- Order: Poales
- Family: Cyperaceae
- Genus: Cyperus
- Species: C. marlothii

Binomial name
- Cyperus marlothii Boeckeler

Species of sedge

Cyperus marlothii is a species of sedge that is native to southern Africa, ranging from Mozambique, Botswana, and Namibia to South Africa.

The species was first formally described by the botanist Johann Otto Boeckeler in 1889.

== See also ==
- List of Cyperus species
