= Cyperus callistus =

Scientific classification
- Kingdom: Plantae
- Clade: Tracheophytes
- Clade: Angiosperms
- Clade: Monocots
- Clade: Commelinids
- Order: Poales
- Family: Cyperaceae
- Genus: Cyperus
- Species: C. callistus

Binomial name
- Cyperus callistus Ridl.

Species of plant in native to Africa

Cyperus callistus is a species of sedge that is native to an area of southern Africa.

The species was first formally described by the botanist Henry Nicholas Ridley in 1884.

== See also ==
- List of Cyperus species
