= Cyperus pectinatus =

Conservation status
- Least Concern (IUCN 3.1)

Scientific classification
- Kingdom: Plantae
- Clade: Tracheophytes
- Clade: Angiosperms
- Clade: Monocots
- Clade: Commelinids
- Order: Poales
- Family: Cyperaceae
- Genus: Cyperus
- Species: C. pectinatus

Binomial name
- Cyperus pectinatus Vahl 1805

Species of sedge

Cyperus pectinatus is a species of sedge that is native to much of Africa.

== See also ==
- List of Cyperus species
