= Carex rhodesiaca =

Scientific classification
- Kingdom: Plantae
- Clade: Tracheophytes
- Clade: Angiosperms
- Clade: Monocots
- Clade: Commelinids
- Order: Poales
- Family: Cyperaceae
- Genus: Carex
- Species: C. rhodesiaca

Binomial name
- Carex rhodesiaca Nelmes

Species of grass-like plant

Carex rhodesiaca is a sedge of the Cyperaceae family that is native to mostly southern parts of Africa in Zambia, Zimbabwe, South Africa, Lesotho and Eswatini but also to Cameroon in the north.

The perennial sedge has a tufted habit and is typically 25 to 60 cm (9.8 to 23.6 in) tall. It has glabrous flat to plicate shaped leaves with a blande that is 30 to 48 cm (12 to 19 in) in length and 3 to 7 mm (0.12 to 0.28 in) wide. The knotty culms have a triangular cross section and are approximately 2 mm (0.079 in) wide.

== See also ==
- List of Carex species
