= Cyperus pulcher =

Scientific classification
- Kingdom: Plantae
- Clade: Tracheophytes
- Clade: Angiosperms
- Clade: Monocots
- Clade: Commelinids
- Order: Poales
- Family: Cyperaceae
- Genus: Cyperus
- Species: C. pulcher

Binomial name
- Cyperus pulcher Thunb. (1794)

Synonyms
- Cyperus ingratus Kunth (1837); Cyperus prasinus Kunth (1837); Cyperus pulcher var. prasinus (Kunth) Kük. (1936)

Species of sedge

Cyperus pulcher is a species of sedge native to the Cape Provinces and KwaZulu-Natal in South Africa.

== See also ==
- List of Cyperus species
