= Cyperus bellus =

Scientific classification
- Kingdom: Plantae
- Clade: Tracheophytes
- Clade: Angiosperms
- Clade: Monocots
- Clade: Commelinids
- Order: Poales
- Family: Cyperaceae
- Genus: Cyperus
- Species: C. bellus

Binomial name
- Cyperus bellus Kunth

Species of plant native to southern Africa

Cyperus bellus is a species of sedge that is native to southern Africa, including Botswana, Namibia, and the Cape Provinces, Free State, and Northern Provinces of South Africa.

The species was first formally described by the botanist Carl Sigismund Kunth in 1837.

== See also ==
- List of Cyperus species
