= Carex condensata =

Scientific classification
- Kingdom: Plantae
- Clade: Tracheophytes
- Clade: Angiosperms
- Clade: Monocots
- Clade: Commelinids
- Order: Poales
- Family: Cyperaceae
- Genus: Carex
- Species: C. condensata

Binomial name
- Carex condensata Nees

Species of sedge

Carex condensata is a tussock-forming species of perennial sedge in the family Cyperaceae. It is native to parts of Asia, from the eastern Himalayas in the north west to Thailand in the south east.

== See also ==
- List of Carex species
