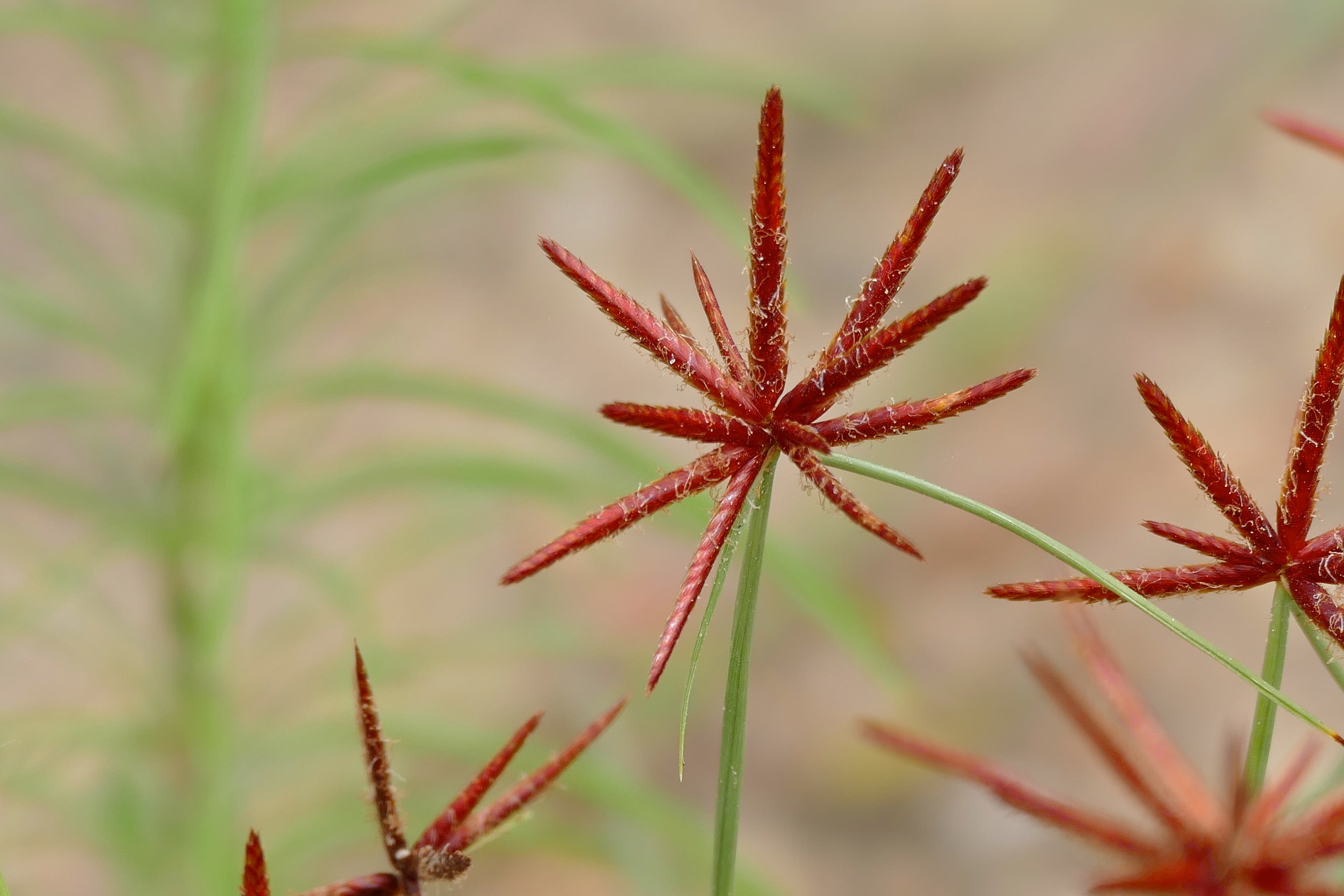

Scientific classification
- Kingdom: Plantae
- Clade: Tracheophytes
- Clade: Angiosperms
- Clade: Monocots
- Clade: Commelinids
- Order: Poales
- Family: Cyperaceae
- Genus: Cyperus
- Species: C. rupestris

Binomial name
- Cyperus rupestris Kunth

= Cyperus rupestris =

Species of plant native to Africa and Asia

Cyperus rupestris is a species of sedge that is native to south eastern parts of Africa and a small area of Asia.

The species was first formally described by the botanist Carl Sigismund Kunth in 1837.

== See also ==
- List of Cyperus species
