= Carex glomerata =

Scientific classification
- Kingdom: Plantae
- Clade: Tracheophytes
- Clade: Angiosperms
- Clade: Monocots
- Clade: Commelinids
- Order: Poales
- Family: Cyperaceae
- Genus: Carex
- Species: C. glomerata

Binomial name
- Carex glomerata Thunb. (1794)

Synonyms
- Carex glomerabilis V.I.Krecz. (1937), nom. superfl.; Carex leribensis Nelmes (1940); Carex schlechteri Nelmes (1940); Carex vulpina subsp. glomerata (Thunb.) Wahlenb. (1803)

Species of plant

Carex glomerabilis is a tussock-forming species of perennial sedge in the family Cyperaceae. It is native to South Africa and Lesotho.

== See also ==
- List of Carex species
