= Carex acocksii =

Conservation status
- Critically Endangered (IUCN 3.1)

Scientific classification
- Kingdom: Plantae
- Clade: Embryophytes
- Clade: Tracheophytes
- Clade: Spermatophytes
- Clade: Angiosperms
- Clade: Monocots
- Clade: Commelinids
- Order: Poales
- Family: Cyperaceae
- Genus: Carex
- Species: C. acocksii

Binomial name
- Carex acocksii C.Archer

Species of plant in the sedge family

Carex acocksii is a tussock-forming species of perennial sedge in the family Cyperaceae. It is native to the Cape Provinces area of South Africa.

== Description ==
It has an erect and tufted habit with a height of around 46 cm (18 in) with cylindrical stems that have a diameter of about 1 mm (0.039 in) and channel bladed leaves that are about half the length of the stems and have a width of 0.75 mm (0.030 in).

== Distribution and habitat ==
Carex acocksii is known from only two populations in the Northern Cape of South Africa. It is situated at elevations of over 1,500 m (4,900 ft) on the Hantamsberg and Roggeveld Escarpment growing in seasonally damp areas on sandstone or dolerite usually beneath shrubs.

== See also ==
- List of Carex species
