= Cyperus schinzii =

Scientific classification
- Kingdom: Plantae
- Clade: Tracheophytes
- Clade: Angiosperms
- Clade: Monocots
- Clade: Commelinids
- Order: Poales
- Family: Cyperaceae
- Genus: Cyperus
- Species: C. schinzii

Binomial name
- Cyperus schinzii Boeckeler

Species of sedge

Cyperus schinzii is a species of sedge that is native to the south west of Africa, where it has been found in Angola, Botswana, Namibia and South Africa.

The species was first formally described by the botanist Johann Otto Boeckeler in 1888.

== See also ==
- List of Cyperus species
