= Kyllinga melanosperma =

Scientific classification
- Kingdom: Plantae
- Clade: Tracheophytes
- Clade: Angiosperms
- Clade: Monocots
- Clade: Commelinids
- Order: Poales
- Family: Cyperaceae
- Genus: Kyllinga
- Species: K. melanosperma

Binomial name
- Kyllinga melanosperma Nees

Species of grass-like plant

Kyllinga melanosperma is a species of sedge, covered with dark brown scales that culm together to form rhizomes that are about 30–100 centimetres (12–39 in) long. The rhizomes are 2.5–4.0 millimetres (0.10–0.16 in) thick with a purple-brown sheath at the bottom. Kyllinga melanosperma is found in tropical Africa, southern and southeastern Asia. Kyllinga melanosperma propagates by seed.
