= Cyperus capensis =

Scientific classification
- Kingdom: Plantae
- Clade: Tracheophytes
- Clade: Angiosperms
- Clade: Monocots
- Clade: Commelinids
- Order: Poales
- Family: Cyperaceae
- Genus: Cyperus
- Species: C. capensis

Binomial name
- Cyperus capensis (Steud.) Endl.

Species of sedge

Cyperus capensis is a species of sedge that is native to South Africa, Mozambique, and Eswatini in southern Africa.

== See also ==
- List of Cyperus species
