= Carex killickii =

Scientific classification
- Kingdom: Plantae
- Clade: Tracheophytes
- Clade: Angiosperms
- Clade: Monocots
- Clade: Commelinids
- Order: Poales
- Family: Cyperaceae
- Genus: Carex
- Species: C. killickii

Binomial name
- Carex killickii Nelmes

Synonyms
- Schoenoxiphium filiforme Kük.; Schoenoxiphium molle Kukkonen; Schoenoxiphium strictum Kukkonen

Species of grass-like plant

Carex killickii is a sedge of the Cyperaceae family that is native to southern parts of Africa including the Cape Provinces and Free State, Lesotho and KwaZulu-Natal provinces of South Africa.

== Description ==
C. killickii is a perennial sedge that can have a longer rhizome or be shortly tufted. It typically grows to a height of 0.16 to 0.30 m (6.3 in to 11.8 in) and has smooth filiform culms and 0.8 mm (0.031 in) in diameter.The rigid leaves tend to be shorter than the culms and tend to be folded or inrolled. Each inflorescence has subtending bracts and a length of 25 to 30 mm (0.98 to 1.18 in).

== Range ==
Found in temperate seasonally wet parts of southern Africa it is often situated on alpine grassland such as the Drakensberg grassland particularly in marshy areas.

== See also ==
- List of Carex species
