= Umbrella grass =

Several species of plants are known by the common name umbrella grass or umbrella-grass, including:

- Chloris truncata, a grass
- Cyperus alternifolius, a sedge
- Digitaria divaricatissima, a grass
- Many species of the grass genus Enteropogon, such as Enteropogon acicularis
- Several species of the sedge genus Fuirena
