= Netrostylis =

Scientific classification
- Kingdom: Plantae
- Clade: Tracheophytes
- Clade: Angiosperms
- Clade: Monocots
- Clade: Commelinids
- Order: Poales
- Family: Cyperaceae
- Subfamily: Cyperoideae
- Tribe: Lepidospermatinae
- Genus: Netrostylis; R.L.Barrett, J.J.Bruhl & K.L.Wilson

Species
- Netrostylis capillaris (F.Muell.) R.L.Barrett, J.J.Bruhl & K.L.Wilson; Netrostylis halmaturina (J.M.Black) R.L.Barrett, J.J.Bruhl & K.L.Wilson

Genus of flowering plants

Netrostylis is a genus of flowering plants in the family Cyperaceae. It includes two species of sedges native to New Zealand and southern and eastern Australia.

- Netrostylis capillaris (F.Muell.) R.L.Barrett, J.J.Bruhl & K.L.Wilson – southern and eastern Australia (New South Wales, Queensland, South Australia, Tasmania, and Victoria) and New Zealand
- Netrostylis halmaturina (J.M.Black) R.L.Barrett, J.J.Bruhl & K.L.Wilson – South Australia (Kangaroo Island)
