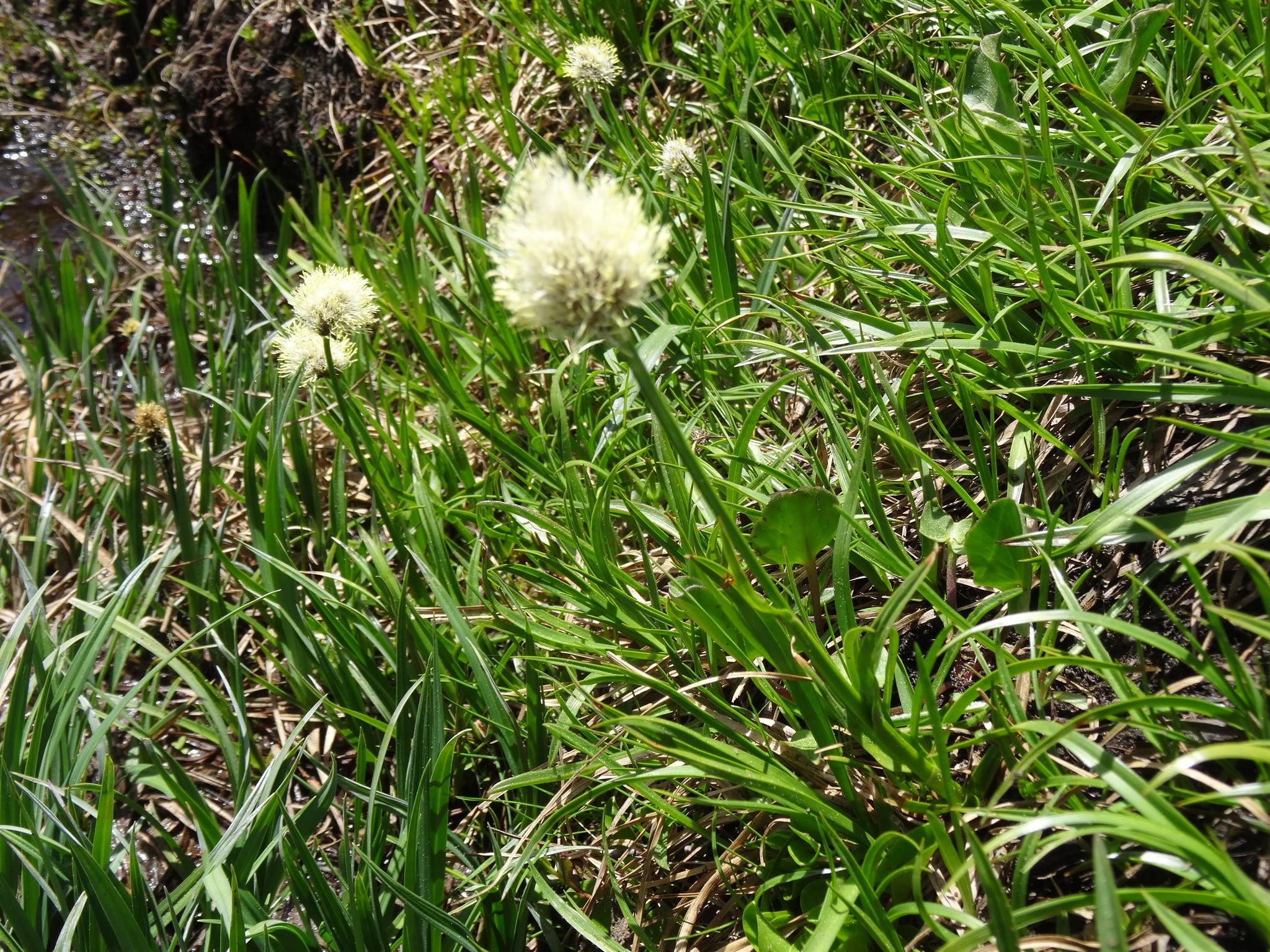
- Calliscirpus brachythrix

Scientific classification
- Kingdom: Plantae
- Clade: Tracheophytes
- Clade: Angiosperms
- Clade: Monocots
- Clade: Commelinids
- Order: Poales
- Family: Cyperaceae
- Genus: Calliscirpus; C.N.Gilmour, J.R.Starr & Naczi

= Calliscirpus =

Genus of flowering plants

Calliscirpus is a genus of flowering plants belonging to the family Cyperaceae.

Its native range is Oregon to California.

Species:

- Calliscirpus brachythrix C.N.Gilmour, J.R.Starr & Naczi
- Calliscirpus criniger (A.Gray) C.N.Gilmour, J.R.Starr & Naczi
