= Rhynchocladium =

Scientific classification
- Kingdom: Plantae
- Clade: Tracheophytes
- Clade: Angiosperms
- Clade: Monocots
- Clade: Commelinids
- Order: Poales
- Family: Cyperaceae
- Genus: Rhynchocladium; T.Koyama
- Species: R. steyermarkii

Binomial name
- Rhynchocladium steyermarkii (T.Koyama) T.Koyama

Synonyms
- Cladium steyermarkii T.Koyama

Genus of plants

Rhynchocladium is a monotypic genus of flowering plants belonging to the family Cyperaceae. The only species is Rhynchocladium steyermarkii.

Its native range is southern Venezuela to Guyana.
