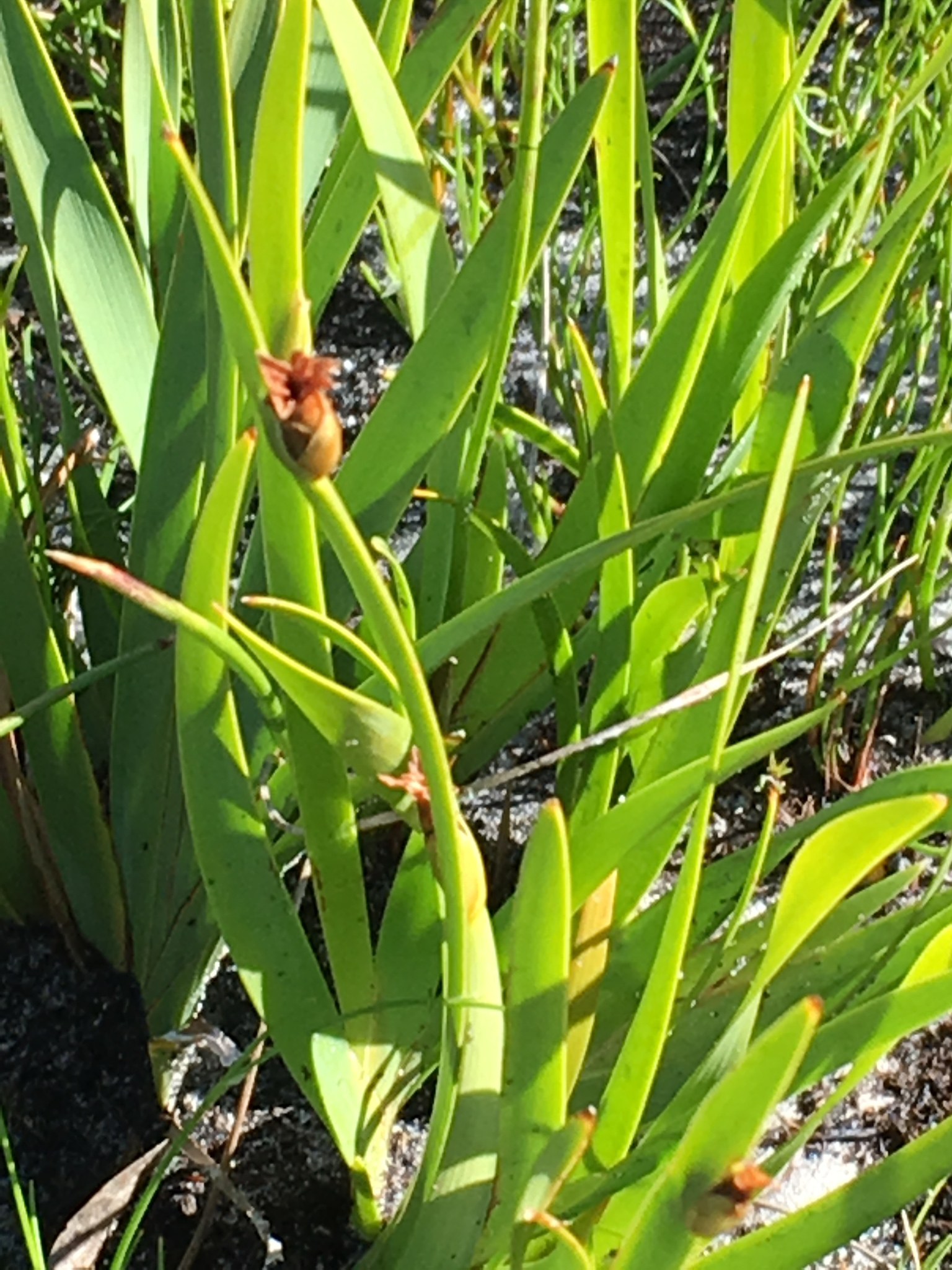
- Chrysitrix capensis var. capensis

Scientific classification
- Kingdom: Plantae
- Clade: Tracheophytes
- Clade: Angiosperms
- Clade: Monocots
- Clade: Commelinids
- Order: Poales
- Family: Cyperaceae
- Genus: Chrysitrix; L.

Type species
- Chrysitrix capensis L.

= Chrysitrix =

Genus of grass-like plants

Chrysitrix is a group of plants in the Cyperaceae described as a genus by Linnaeus in 1771.

It is native to Cape Province in South Africa and also the State of Western Australia.

== Species ==
Four species are accepted.

- Chrysitrix capensis L. – Cape Province
- Chrysitrix distigmatosa C.B.Clarke ex Diels & Pritz. – Western Australia
- Chrysitrix dodii C.B.Clarke – Cape Province
- Chrysitrix junciformis Nees – Cape Province
