= Asterochaete =

Scientific classification
- Kingdom: Plantae
- Clade: Tracheophytes
- Clade: Angiosperms
- Clade: Monocots
- Clade: Commelinids
- Order: Poales
- Family: Cyperaceae
- Subfamily: Cyperoideae
- Tribe: Schoeneae
- Genus: Asterochaete; Nees

Genus of flowering plants

Asterochaete is a genus of flowering plants in the family Cyperaceae. It includes 11 species of sedges native to central and Southern Africa.

== Species ==
11 species are accepted.

- Asterochaete acuminata X.F.Zhang
- Asterochaete angustissima (Cherm.) X.F.Zhang
- Asterochaete borbonica (Steud.) X.F.Zhang
- Asterochaete capitellata Nees
- Asterochaete dactyloides (Vahl) K.L.Wilson & J.J.Bruhl
- Asterochaete discolor T.H.Arnold ex X.F.Zhang
- Asterochaete eminii (K.Schum.) X.F.Zhang
- Asterochaete filifolia (C.Reid & T.H.Arnold) X.F.Zhang
- Asterochaete nitens Kunth
- Asterochaete schlechteri (C.B.Clarke) X.F.Zhang
- Asterochaete ulugurensis Nelmes ex X.F.Zhang
