= Didymiandrum =

Scientific classification
- Kingdom: Plantae
- Clade: Tracheophytes
- Clade: Angiosperms
- Clade: Monocots
- Clade: Commelinids
- Order: Poales
- Family: Cyperaceae
- Genus: Didymiandrum; Gilly
- Species: D. stellatum

Binomial name
- Didymiandrum stellatum (Boeckeler) Gilly

Synonyms
- Acrocarpus stellatus Nees ex Boeckeler; Cryptangium stellatum Boeckeler (1874) (basionym); Didymiandrum guaiquinimae Schnee; Lagenocarpus stellatus (Boeckeler) Kuntze

Genus of flowering plants

Didymiandrum is a genus of flowering plants in the family Cyperaceae. It contains a single species, Didymiandrum stellatum, a rhizomatous geophytic sedge native to southern Venezuela (Bolívar), southern Guyana, and northern Brazil.
