= Trichoschoenus =

Scientific classification
- Kingdom: Plantae
- Clade: Tracheophytes
- Clade: Angiosperms
- Clade: Monocots
- Clade: Commelinids
- Order: Poales
- Family: Cyperaceae
- Genus: Trichoschoenus; J.Raynal
- Species: T. bosseri

Binomial name
- Trichoschoenus bosseri J.Raynal

Genus of flowering plants

Trichoschoenus is a monotypic genus of flowering plants belonging to the family Cyperaceae. The single species, Trichoschoenus bosseri J.Raynal, is endemic to Madagascar.
