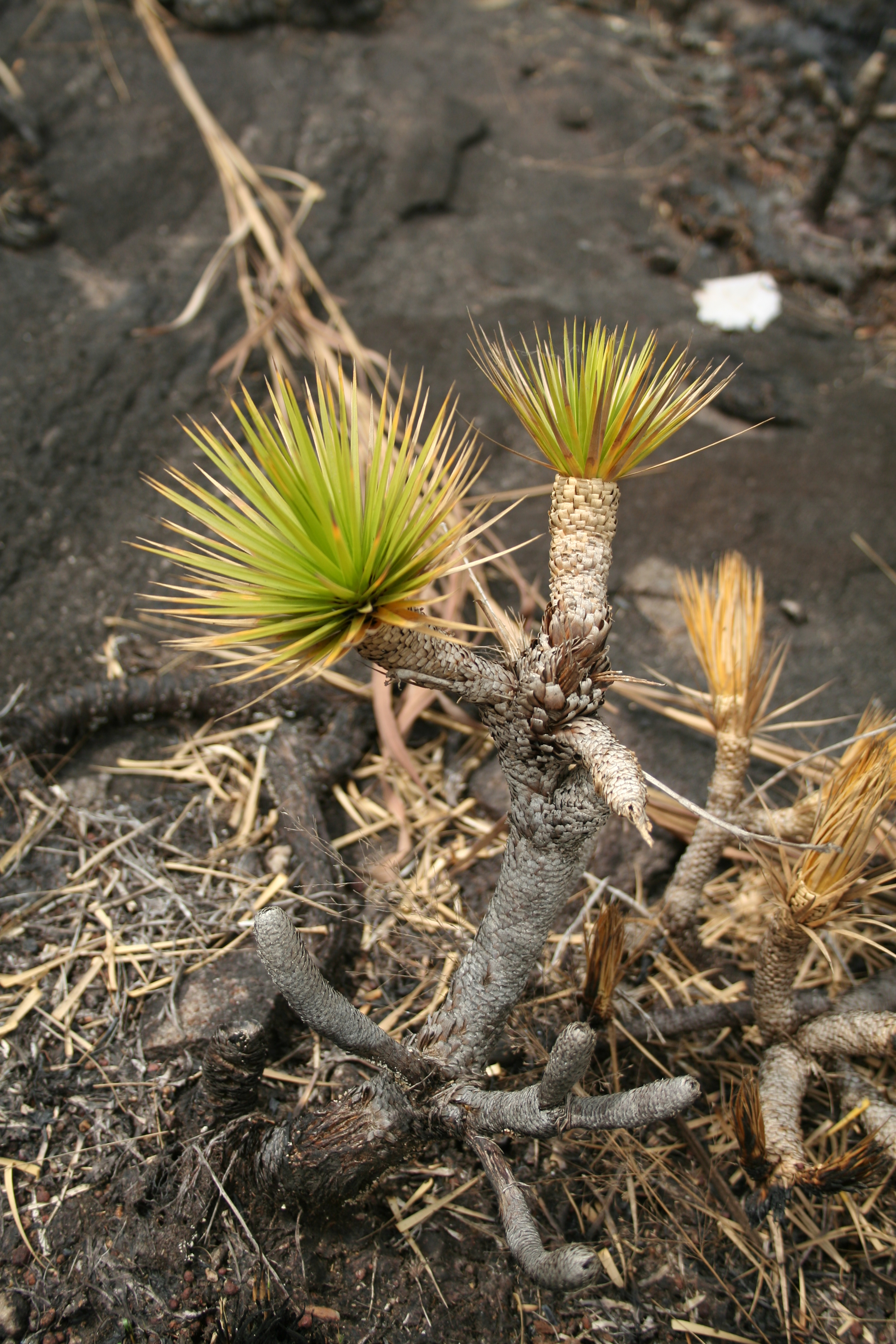

Scientific classification
- Kingdom: Plantae
- Clade: Tracheophytes
- Clade: Angiosperms
- Clade: Monocots
- Clade: Commelinids
- Order: Poales
- Family: Cyperaceae
- Genus: Microdracoides; Hua
- Species: M. squamosa

Binomial name
- Microdracoides squamosa Hua

Synonyms
- Schoenodendron Engl.; Schoenodendron buecheri Engl.

= Microdracoides =

Genus of plants

Microdracoides is a monotypic genus of flowering plants belonging to the family Cyperaceae. The only species is Microdracoides squamosa.

It is a subshrub native to Guinea, Sierra Leone, Nigeria, and Cameroon in western and west-central tropical Africa.
