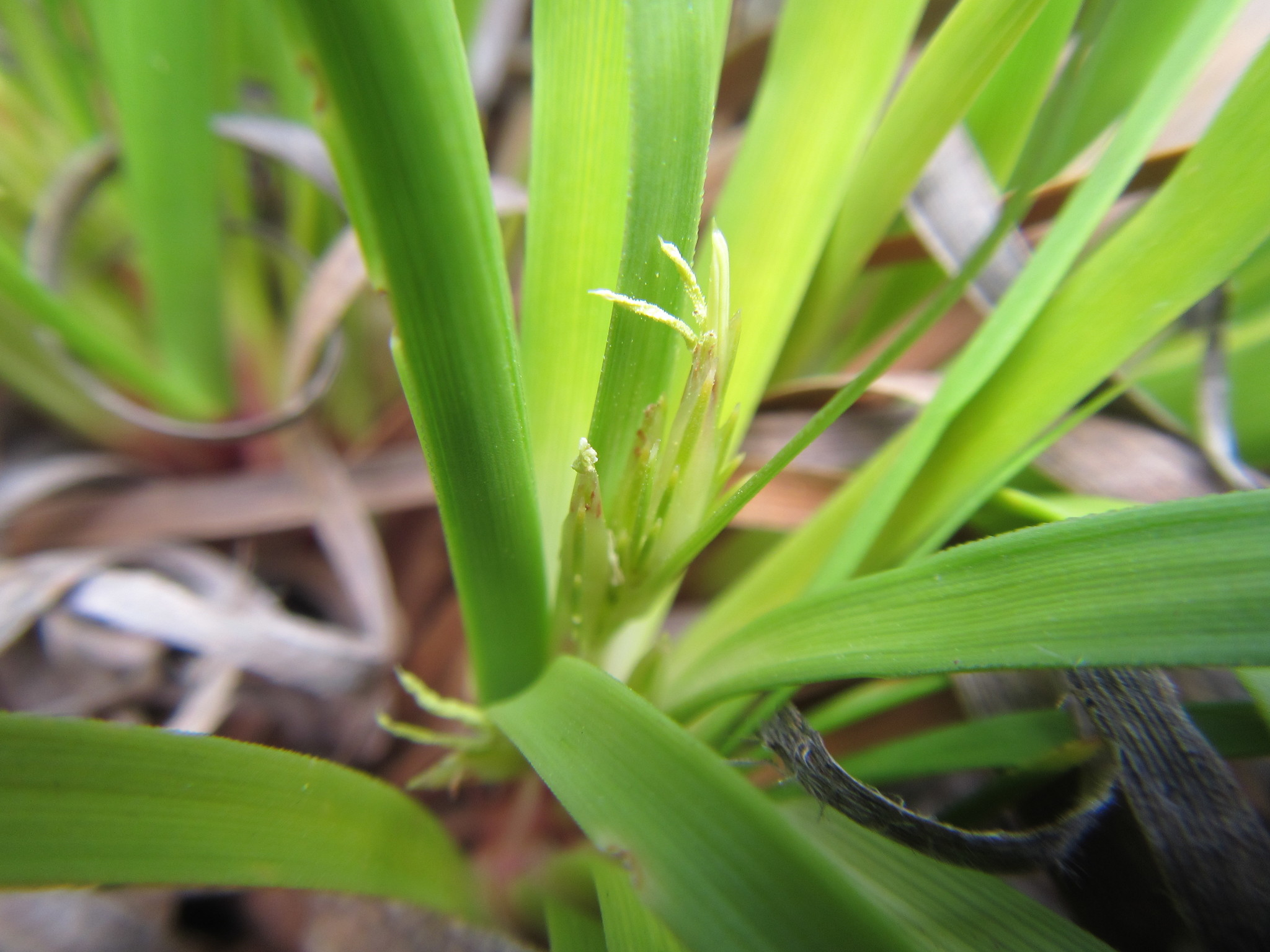

Scientific classification
- Kingdom: Plantae
- Clade: Tracheophytes
- Clade: Angiosperms
- Clade: Monocots
- Clade: Commelinids
- Order: Poales
- Family: Cyperaceae
- Genus: Capeobolus; Browning
- Species: C. brevicaulis

Binomial name
- Capeobolus brevicaulis (C.B.Clarke) Browning

Synonyms
- Costularia brevicaulis C.B.Clarke (1898); Tetraria brevicaulis C.B.Clarke (1894), nom. nud.

= Capeobolus =

Genus of flowering plants

Capeobolus is a monotypic genus of flowering plants belonging to the family Cyperaceae. The only species in the genus is Capeobolus brevicaulis, a perennial sedge native to the endemic to the Cape Provinces of South Africa.
