= Nelmesia =

Scientific classification
- Kingdom: Plantae
- Clade: Embryophytes
- Clade: Tracheophytes
- Clade: Spermatophytes
- Clade: Angiosperms
- Clade: Monocots
- Clade: Commelinids
- Order: Poales
- Family: Cyperaceae
- Genus: Nelmesia; Van der Veken
- Species: N. melanostachya

Binomial name
- Nelmesia melanostachya Van der Veken

Species of flowering plant

Nelmesia is a monotypic genus of flowering plants belonging to the family Cyperaceae. The only species is Nelmesia melanostachya Van der Veken.

It is native to Zaire.

The genus name of Nelmesia is in honour of Ernest Nelmes (1895–1959), an English botanist, gardener and librarian. He worked at Kew Gardens in the herbarium and library, he was also a specialist in Carex and Cyperaceae. Both the genus and the species were first described and published in Bull. Jard. Bot. État Bruxelles Vol.25 on page 143 in 1955.
