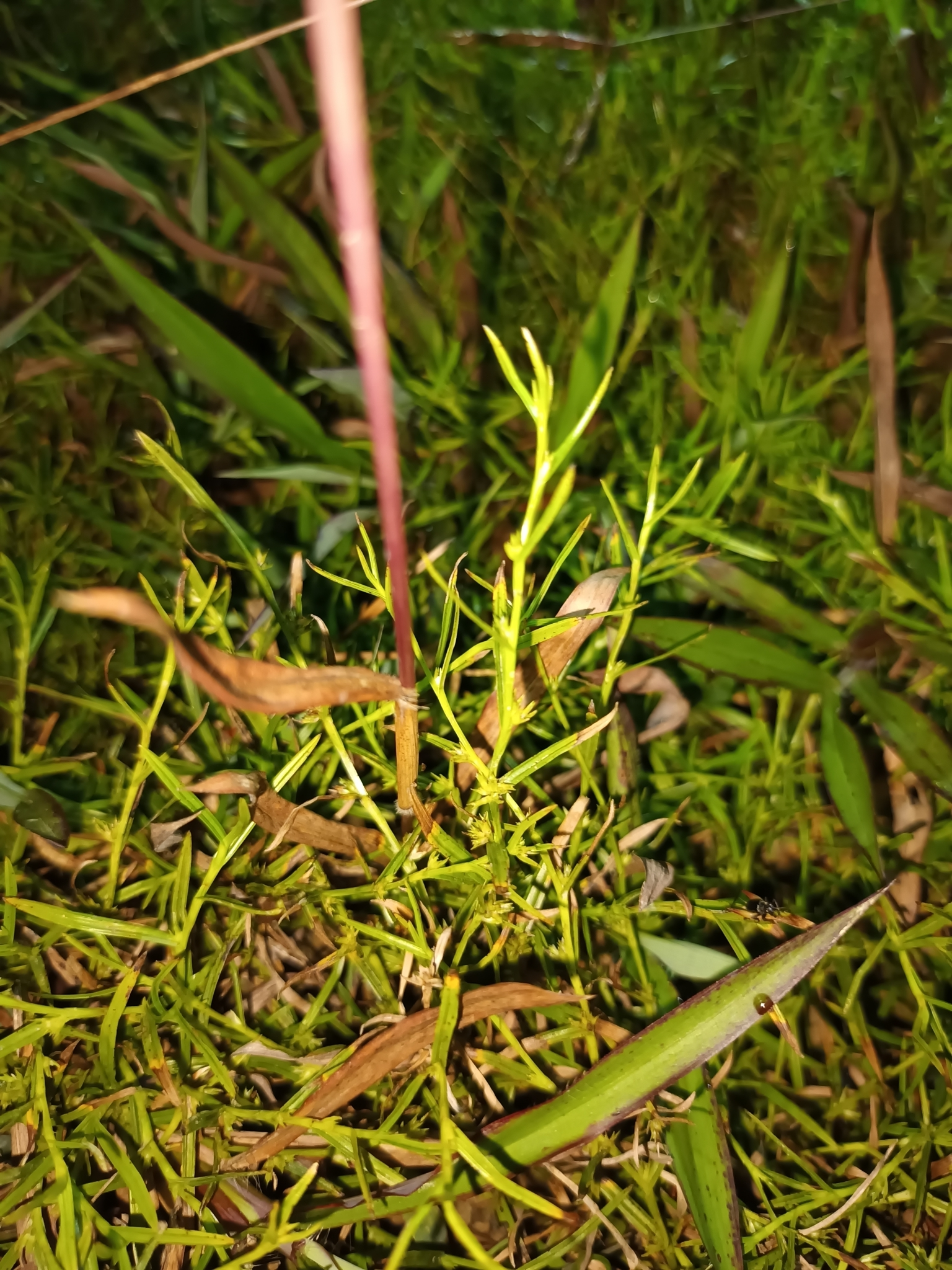
- Diplacrum caricinum

Scientific classification
- Kingdom: Plantae
- Clade: Tracheophytes
- Clade: Angiosperms
- Clade: Monocots
- Clade: Commelinids
- Order: Poales
- Family: Cyperaceae
- Genus: Diplacrum; R.Br.

= Diplacrum =

Genus of plants

Diplacrum is a genus of flowering plants belonging to the family Cyperaceae.

Its native range is Tropics and Subtropics.

Species:

- Diplacrum africanum (Benth.) C.B.Clarke
- Diplacrum capitatum (Willd.) Boeckeler
- Diplacrum caricinum R.Br.
- Diplacrum exiguum (J.Kern) T.Koyama
- Diplacrum guianense (Nees) T.Koyama
- Diplacrum mitracarpoides (Standl. & L.O.Williams) C.D.Adams
- Diplacrum poklei (Wad.Khan) K.C.Mohan
- Diplacrum pygmaeopsis (J.Kern) T.Koyama
- Diplacrum pygmaeum (R.Br.) Nees ex Boeckeler
- Diplacrum reticulatum Holttum
