= Trilepis =

Scientific classification
- Kingdom: Plantae
- Clade: Tracheophytes
- Clade: Angiosperms
- Clade: Monocots
- Clade: Commelinids
- Order: Poales
- Family: Cyperaceae
- Genus: Trilepis; Nees

Synonyms
- Fintelmannia Kunth

Genus of flowering plants

Trilepis is a genus of flowering plants belonging to the family Cyperaceae. It includes five species native to northern South America (Venezuela and the Guianas) and eastern Brazil.

== Species ==
Five species are accepted.

- Trilepis ciliatifolia T.Koyama
- Trilepis kanukuensis Gilly
- Trilepis lhotzkiana Nees
- Trilepis microstachya (C.B.Clarke) H.Pfeiff.
- Trilepis tenuis Vitta
