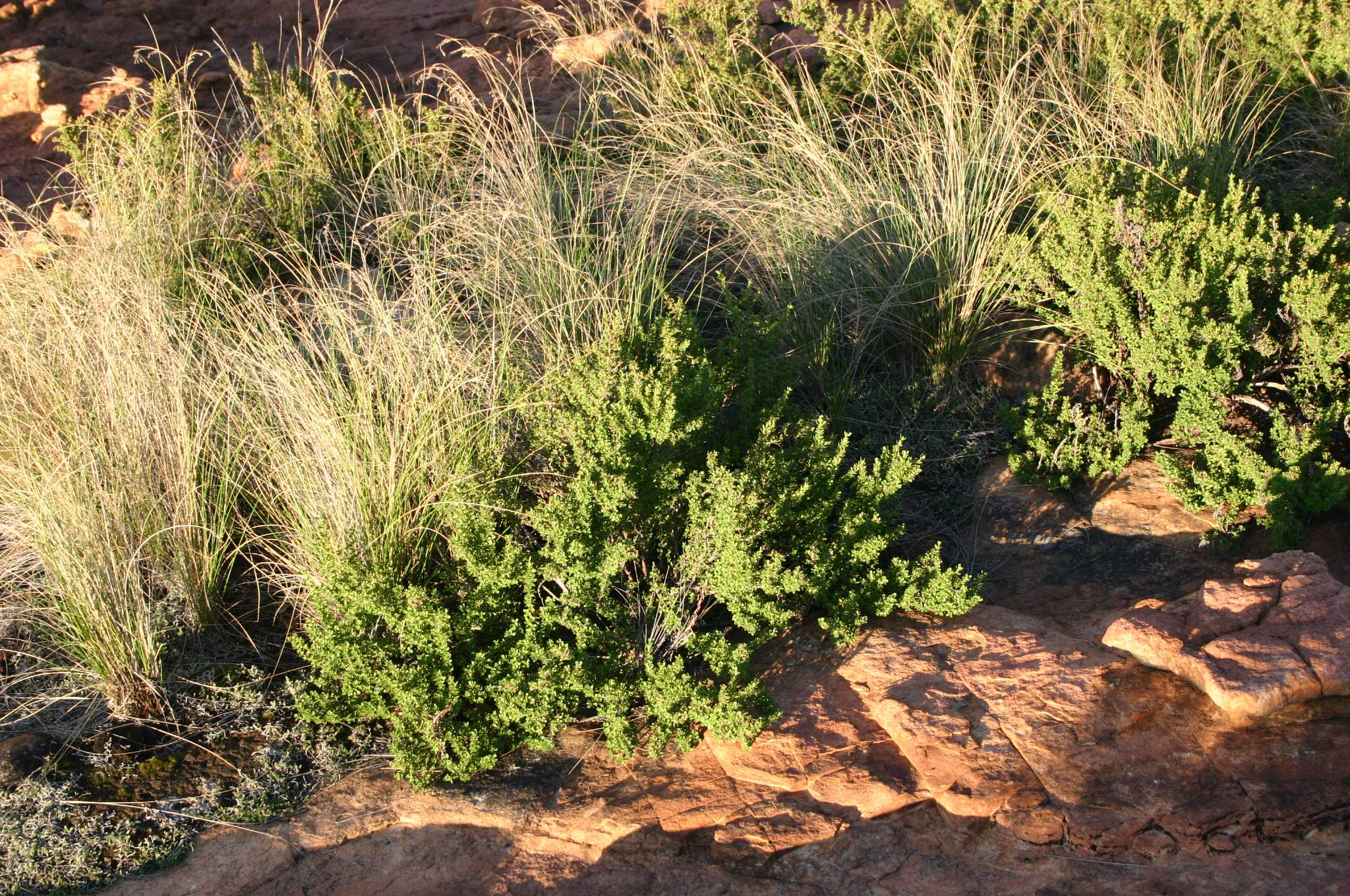
- Habit of Myrothamnus flabellifolius during wet season, growing on quartzite with grasslike tufts of Coleochloa setifera (Ridl.) Gilly, Hamerkop Kloof, Magaliesberg, South Africa

Scientific classification
- Kingdom: Plantae
- Clade: Tracheophytes
- Clade: Angiosperms
- Clade: Monocots
- Clade: Commelinids
- Order: Poales
- Family: Cyperaceae
- Genus: Coleochloa; Gilly

Synonyms
- Eriospora Hochst. ex A.Rich.

= Coleochloa =

Genus of grass-like plants

Coleochloa is a plant genus in the family Cyperaceae. It is found in sub-Saharan Africa and on the Island of Madagascar.

== Species ==
- Coleochloa abyssinica (Hochst. ex A.Rich.) Gilly - eastern and central Africa from Ethiopia west to Nigeria and south to Angola
- Coleochloa domensis Muasya & D.A.Simpson - epiphyte from Cameroon
- Coleochloa glabra Nelmes - Jebel Oda Mountain in northeastern Sudan
- Coleochloa microcephala Nelmes - Mt. Sanje in Tanzania
- Coleochloa pallidior Nelmes - Malawi, Mozambique, Zimbabwe, Northern Province of South Africa
- Coleochloa schweinfurthiana (Boeckeler) Nelmes - Jebel Bangenze of Sudan
- Coleochloa setifera (Ridl.) Gilly - from Tanzania and Zaire south to South Africa; also Madagascar
