= Krenakia =

Scientific classification
- Kingdom: Plantae
- Clade: Tracheophytes
- Clade: Angiosperms
- Clade: Monocots
- Clade: Commelinids
- Order: Poales
- Family: Cyperaceae
- Tribe: Cryptangieae
- Genus: Krenakia; S.M.Costa (2021)

Species
- 10; see text

Synonyms
- Acrocarpus Nees (1842), nom. illeg.

Genus of flowering plants

Krenakia is a genus of flowering plants in the family Cyperaceae. It includes ten species of sedges native to the tropical Americas, including Cuba, Venezuela, and central and southern Brazil.

== Species ==
Ten species are accepted.

- Krenakia claussenii (C.B.Clarke) S.M.Costa
- Krenakia comata (Boeckeler) S.M.Costa
- Krenakia cubensis (Kük.) S.M.Costa
- Krenakia humilis (Nees) S.M.Costa
- Krenakia junciformis (Kunth) S.M.Costa
- Krenakia minarum (Nees) S.M.Costa
- Krenakia polyphylla (Nees) S.M.Costa
- Krenakia subaphylla (T.Koyama) S.M.Costa
- Krenakia triquetra (Boeckeler) S.M.Costa
- Krenakia venezuelensis (Davidse) S.M.Costa
