= Capitularina =

Scientific classification
- Kingdom: Plantae
- Clade: Tracheophytes
- Clade: Angiosperms
- Clade: Monocots
- Clade: Commelinids
- Order: Poales
- Family: Cyperaceae
- Genus: Capitularina; J.Kern
- Species: C. involucrata

Binomial name
- Capitularina involucrata (Valck.Sur.) J.Kern

Synonyms
- Capitularia foliata Uittien; Capitularia foliata var. archboldii Uittien; Capitularia involucrata Valck.Sur. (1912) (basionym); Chorizandra involucrata (Valck.Sur.) Ridl.

Genus of flowering plants

Capitularina is a monotypic genus of flowering plants belonging to the family Cyperaceae. It includes a single species, Capitularina involucrata, a rhizomatous sedge native to New Guinea and the Solomon Islands.
