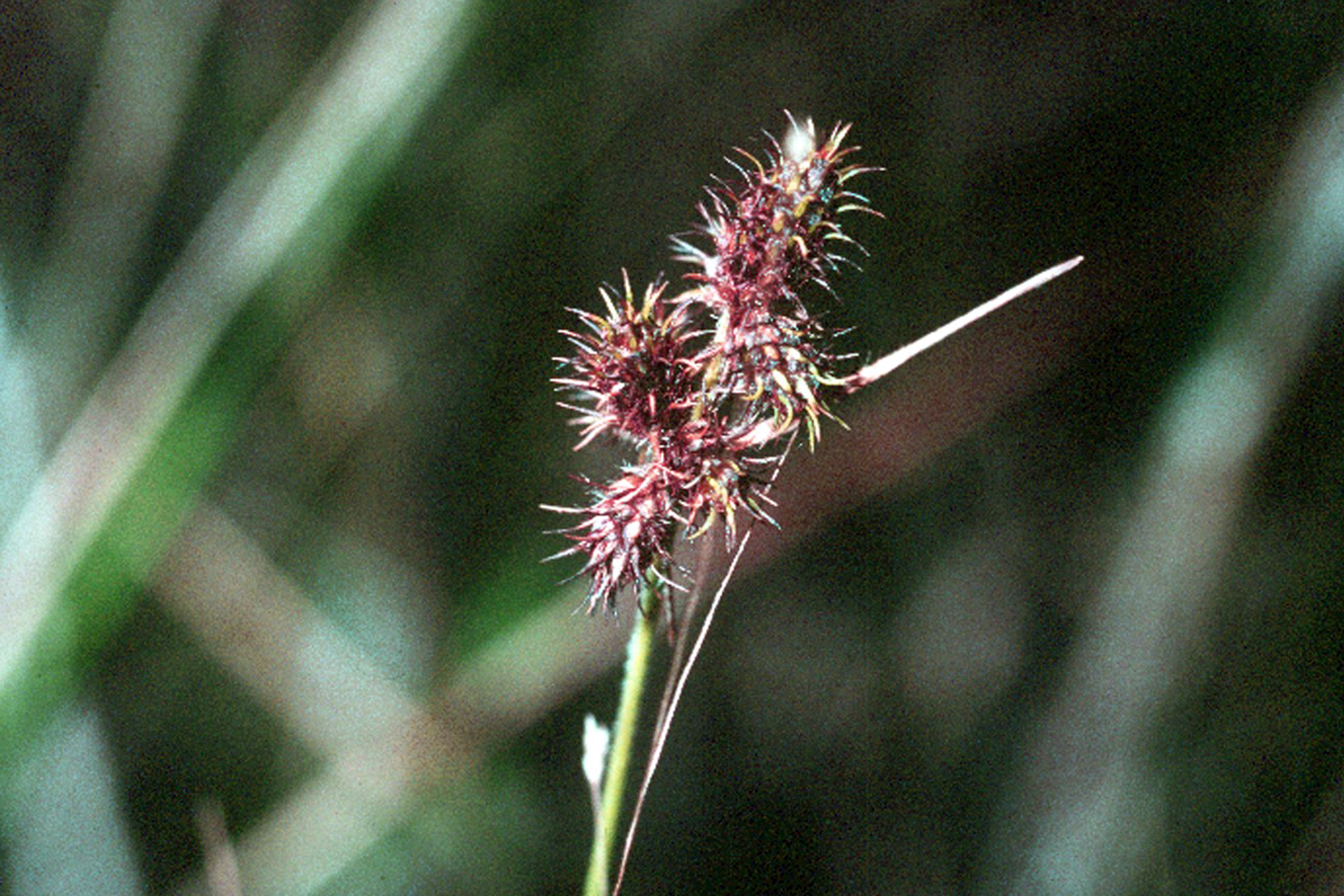
- Fuirena squarrosa

Scientific classification
- Kingdom: Plantae
- Clade: Tracheophytes
- Clade: Angiosperms
- Clade: Monocots
- Clade: Commelinids
- Order: Poales
- Family: Cyperaceae
- Subfamily: Cyperoideae
- Tribe: Fuireneae
- Genus: Fuirena; Rottb.

Species
- See text

Synonyms
- Pentasticha Turcz.; Vaginaria Pers.

= Fuirena =

Genus of Cyperaceae plants

Fuirena, called umbrella sedges or umbrella grasses, are a genus of flowering plants in the sedge family (Cyperaceae), with a worldwide distribution, chiefly in the tropics and temperate zones. They are named for Danish physician and early botanist Georg Fuiren (Jorgen Furenius), 1581–1628.

== Species ==
55 species are currently accepted.

- Fuirena abnormalis C.B.Clarke
- Fuirena angolensis (C.B.Clarke) Lye ex J.Raynal & Roessler
- Fuirena arenosa R.Br.
- Fuirena bernieri Cherm.
- Fuirena bidgoodiae Hoenselaar & Muasya
- Fuirena boreocoerulescens Lye
- Fuirena breviseta (Coville) Coville
- Fuirena bullifera J.Raynal & Roessler
- Fuirena bushii Kral
- Fuirena camptotricha C.Wright
- Fuirena ciliaris (L.) Roxb.
- Fuirena claviseta Peter
- Fuirena coerulescens Steud.
- Fuirena cuspidata (Roth) Kunth
- Fuirena ecklonii Nees
- Fuirena enodis C.B.Clarke
- Fuirena felicis S.S.Hooper
- Fuirena hirsuta (P.J.Bergius) P.L.Forbes
- Fuirena incompleta Nees
- Fuirena incrassata S.T.Blake
- Fuirena lainzii Luceño & M.Alves
- Fuirena leptostachya Oliv.
- Fuirena longa Chapm.
- Fuirena microcarpa Lye
- Fuirena moritziana Boeckeler
- Fuirena mutali Muasya & Nordal
- Fuirena nudiflora S.T.Blake
- Fuirena nyasensis Nelmes
- Fuirena obcordata P.L.Forbes
- Fuirena ochreata Nees ex Kunth
- Fuirena oedipus C.B.Clarke
- Fuirena pachyrrhiza Ridl.
- Fuirena ponmudiensis Ravi & Anil Kumar
- Fuirena pubescens (Poir.) Kunth
- Fuirena pumila (Torr.) Spreng.
- Fuirena quercina Cherm.
- Fuirena repens Boeckeler
- Fuirena rhizomatifera Tang & F.T.Wang
- Fuirena robusta Kunth
- Fuirena sagittata Lye
- Fuirena scirpoidea Michx.
- Fuirena simplex Vahl
- Fuirena simpsonii Ravi, N.Mohanan & Shaju
- Fuirena somaliensis Lye
- Fuirena squarrosa Michx.
- Fuirena stephani Ramos & Diego
- Fuirena striatella Lye
- Fuirena stricta Steud.
- Fuirena swamyi Govind.
- Fuirena tenuis P.L.Forbes
- Fuirena trilobites C.B.Clarke
- Fuirena tuwensis M.B.Deshp. & Shah
- Fuirena umbellata Rottb.
- Fuirena uncinata (Willd.) Kunth
- Fuirena welwitschii Ridl.
- Fuirena zambesiaca Lye

=== Formerly placed here ===
- Cryptangium verticillatum (Spreng.) Vitta (as Fuirena verticillata Spreng.)
