= Chaetospora =

Scientific classification
- Kingdom: Plantae
- Clade: Tracheophytes
- Clade: Angiosperms
- Clade: Monocots
- Clade: Commelinids
- Order: Poales
- Family: Cyperaceae
- Subtribe: Tricostulariinae
- Genus: Chaetospora; R.Br.

Synonyms
- Ptilanthelium Steud.

Genus of flowering plants

Chaetospora is a genus of sedges in the family Cyperaceae. It includes three species native to southeastern and southwestern Australia.

- Chaetospora curvifolia R.Br.
- Chaetospora subbulbosa (Benth.) K.L.Wilson & R.L.Barrett
- Chaetospora turbinata R.Br.
