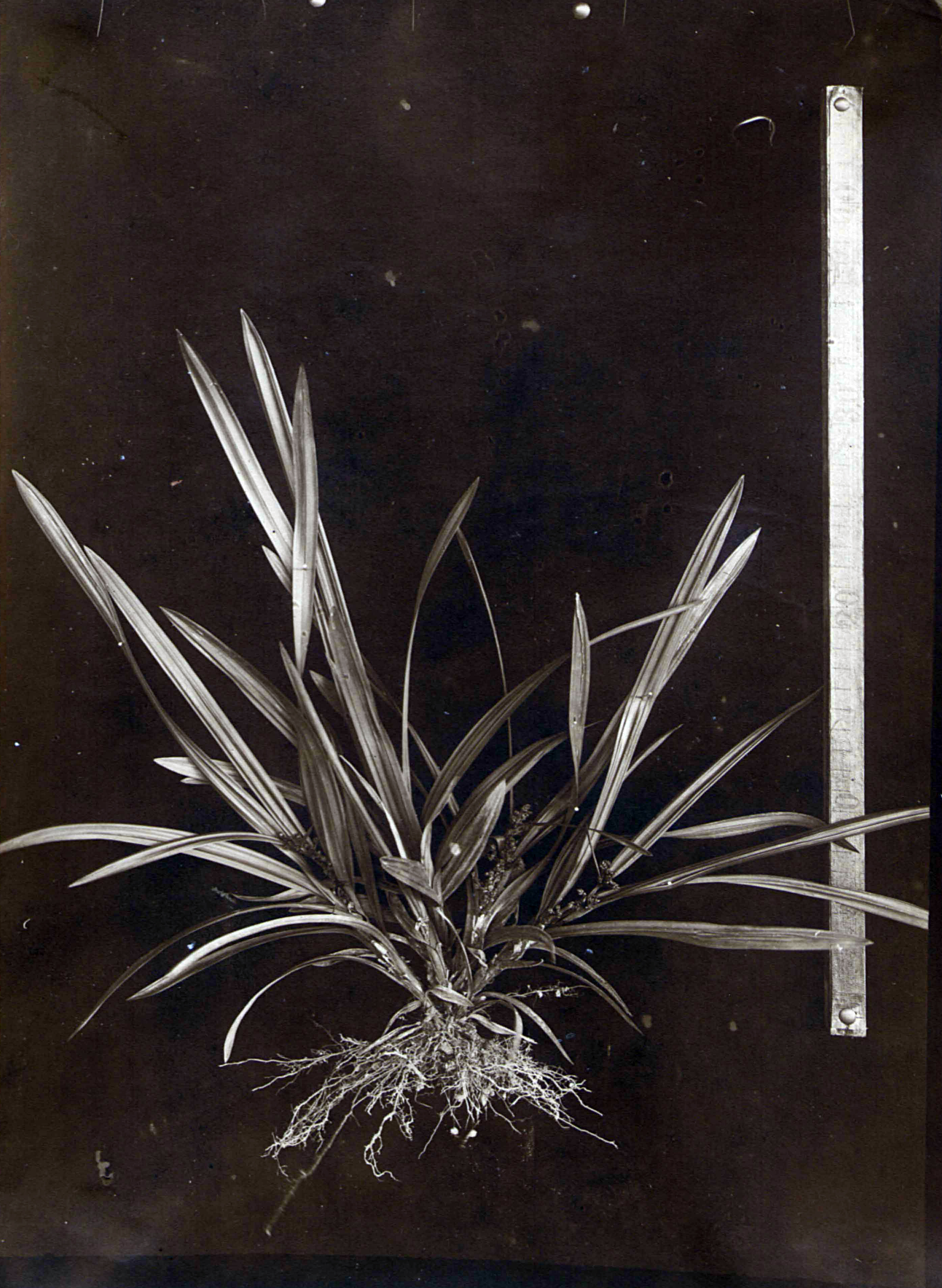
- Unidentified Calyptrocarya, Pará, Brazil, circa 1913-1920

Scientific classification
- Kingdom: Plantae
- Clade: Tracheophytes
- Clade: Angiosperms
- Clade: Monocots
- Clade: Commelinids
- Order: Poales
- Family: Cyperaceae
- Genus: Calyptrocarya; Nees

= Calyptrocarya =

Genus of flowering plants

Calyptrocarya is a genus of flowering plants belonging to the family Cyperaceae.

Its native range is Tropical America.

Species:

- Calyptrocarya bicolor (H.Pfeiff.) T.Koyama
- Calyptrocarya delascioi Davidse & Kral
- Calyptrocarya glomerulata (Brongn.) Urb.
- Calyptrocarya irwiniana T.Koyama
- Calyptrocarya luzuliformis T.Koyama
- Calyptrocarya monocephala Hochst. ex Steud.
- Calyptrocarya montesii Davidse & Kral
- Calyptrocarya poeppigiana Kunth
