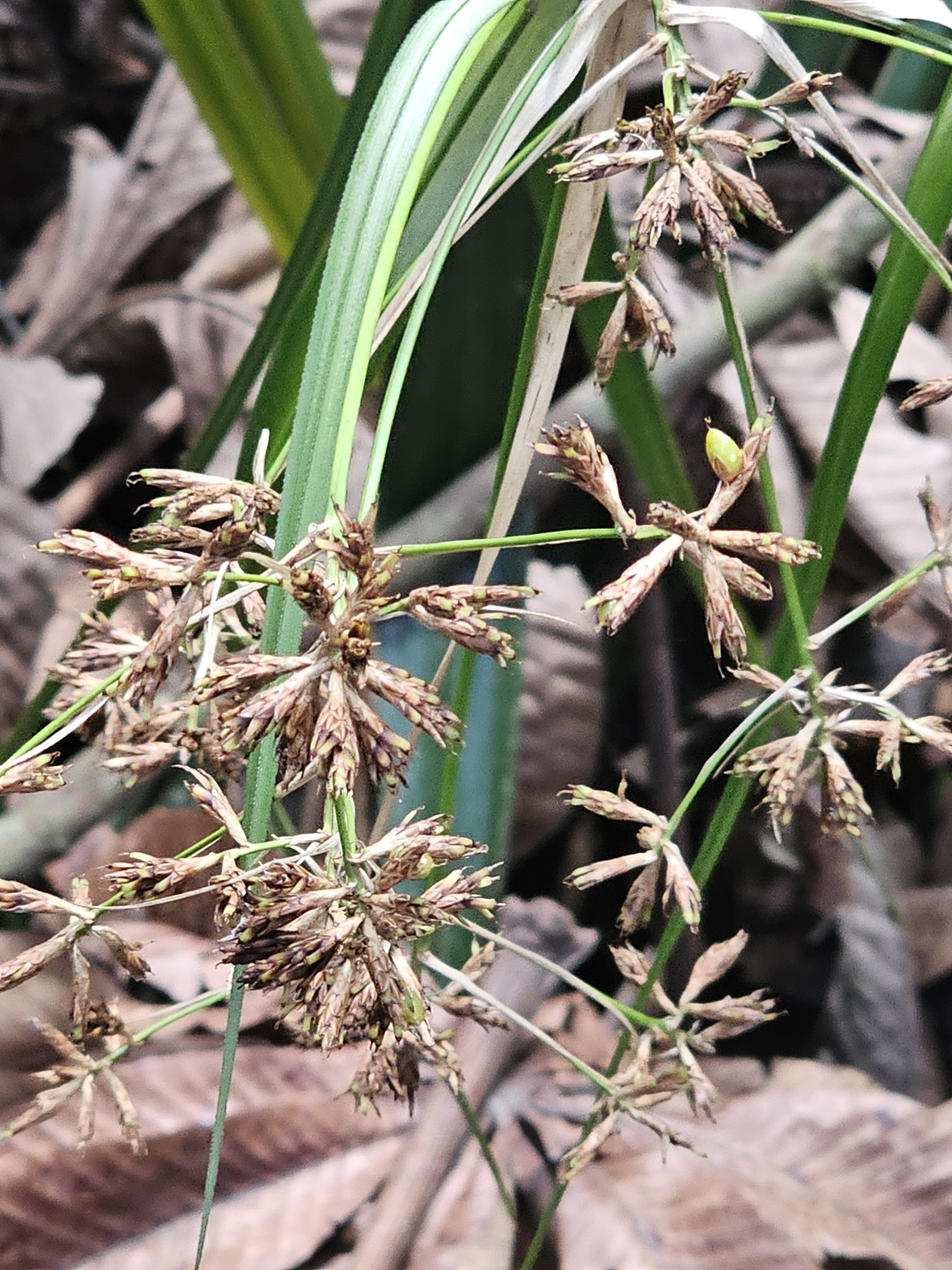

Scientific classification
- Kingdom: Plantae
- Clade: Tracheophytes
- Clade: Angiosperms
- Clade: Monocots
- Clade: Commelinids
- Order: Poales
- Family: Cyperaceae
- Genus: Diplasia; Pers.
- Species: D. karatifolia

Binomial name
- Diplasia karatifolia Rich.

Synonyms
- Fimbristylis bromeliifolia (Rudge) A.Spreng.; Hypolytrum iridifolium Link; Scirpus bromeliifolius Rudge

= Diplasia =

Genus of plants

Diplasia is a monotypic genus of flowering plants belonging to the family Cyperaceae. Its only species, Diplasia karatifolia, is a perennial sedge native to tropical Central and South America, ranging from Costa Rica to Trinidad, the Guianas, northern Brazil, and Bolivia.
