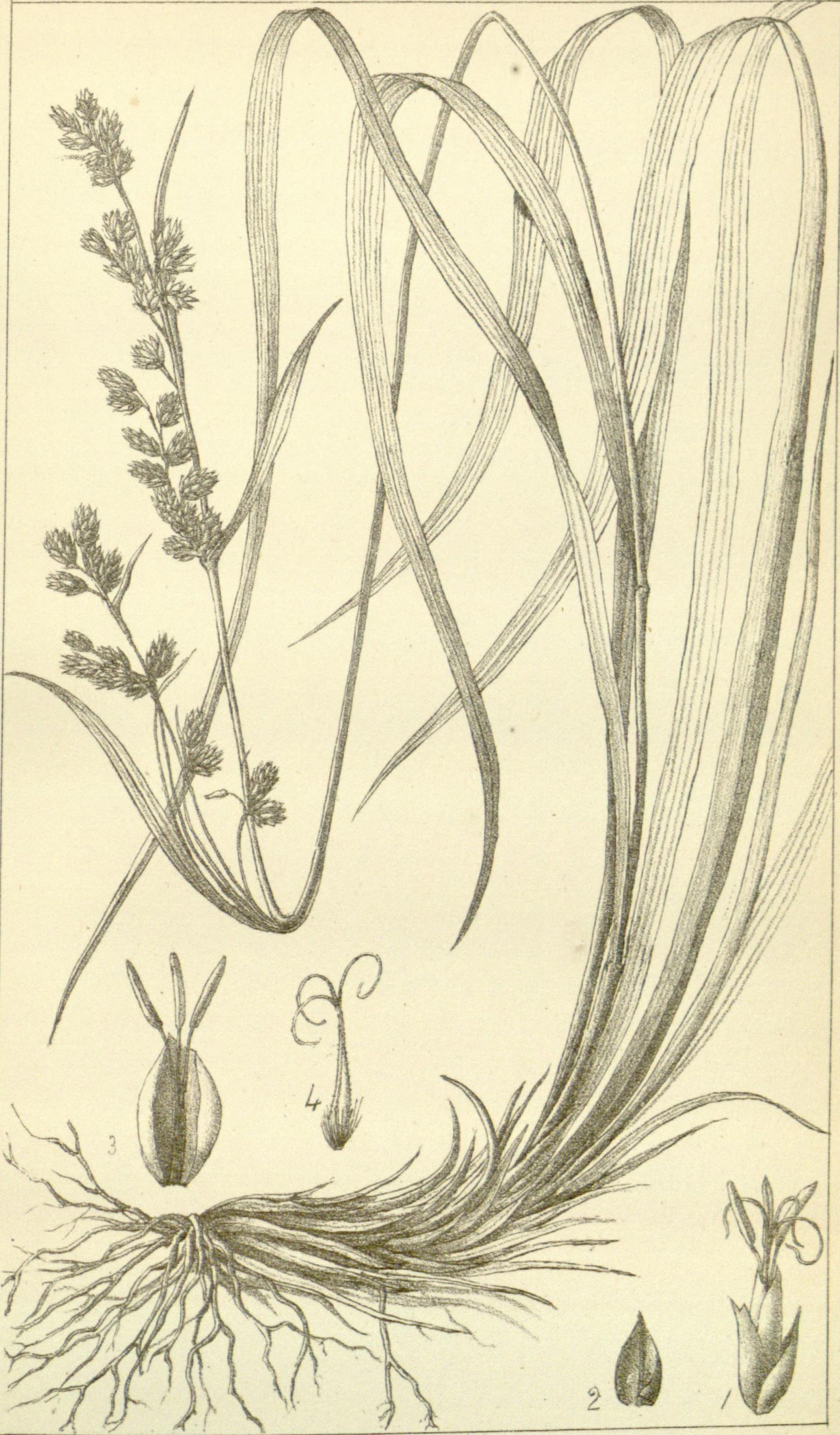
- Afrotrilepis pilosa

Scientific classification
- Kingdom: Plantae
- Clade: Tracheophytes
- Clade: Angiosperms
- Clade: Monocots
- Clade: Commelinids
- Order: Poales
- Family: Cyperaceae
- Genus: Afrotrilepis (Gilly) J.Raynal

= Afrotrilepis =

Genus of flowering plants

Afrotrilepis is a genus of flowering plants belonging to the family Cyperaceae.

Its native range is Western and Western Central Tropical Africa.

Species:

- Afrotrilepis jaegeri J.Raynal
- Afrotrilepis pilosa (Boeckeler) J.Raynal
