= Bisboeckelera =

Scientific classification
- Kingdom: Plantae
- Clade: Tracheophytes
- Clade: Angiosperms
- Clade: Monocots
- Clade: Commelinids
- Order: Poales
- Family: Cyperaceae
- Genus: Bisboeckelera; Kuntze

Genus of flowering plants

Bisboeckelera is a genus of flowering plants belonging to the family Cyperaceae.

Its native range is Southern Tropical America.

Species:

- Bisboeckelera irrigua (Nees) Kuntze
- Bisboeckelera longifolia (Rudge) Kuntze
- Bisboeckelera microcephala (Boeckeler) T.Koyama
- Bisboeckelera vinacea Standl.
