= Khaosokia =

Scientific classification
- Kingdom: Plantae
- Clade: Tracheophytes
- Clade: Angiosperms
- Clade: Monocots
- Clade: Commelinids
- Order: Poales
- Family: Cyperaceae
- Genus: Khaosokia; D.A.Simpson, Chayam. & J.Parn.
- Species: K. caricoides

Binomial name
- Khaosokia caricoides D.A.Simpson, Chayam. & J.Parn.

Genus of plants

Khaosokia is a monotypic genus of flowering plants belonging to the family Cyperaceae. The only species is Khaosokia caricoides.

Its native range is Thailand.
