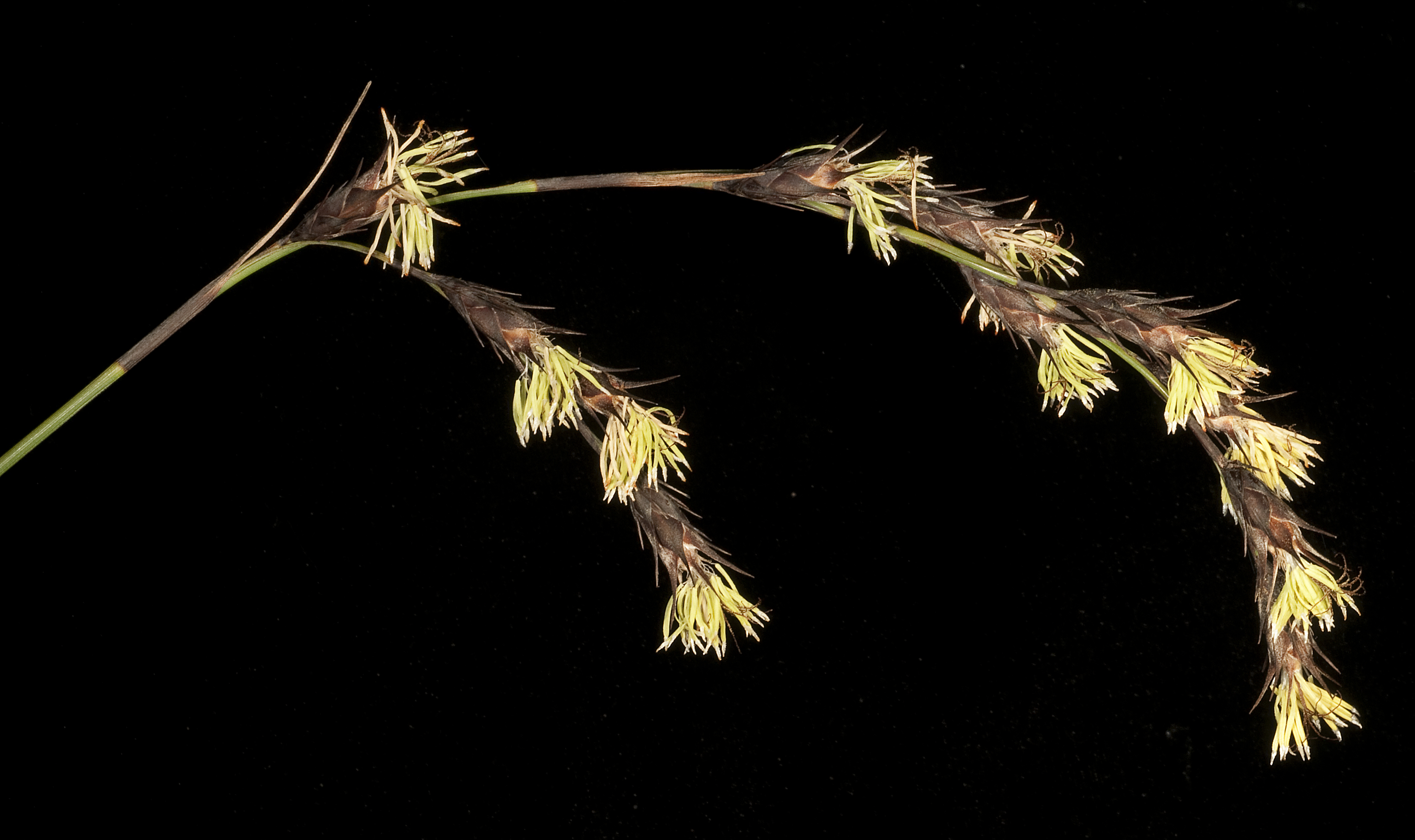

Scientific classification
- Kingdom: Plantae
- Clade: Tracheophytes
- Clade: Angiosperms
- Clade: Monocots
- Clade: Commelinids
- Order: Poales
- Family: Cyperaceae
- Genus: Evandra; R.Br.

= Evandra =

Genus of plants

Evandra is a genus of flowering plants belonging to the family Cyperaceae.

Its native range is Southwestern Australia.

Species:

- Evandra aristata R.Br.
- Evandra pauciflora R.Br.
