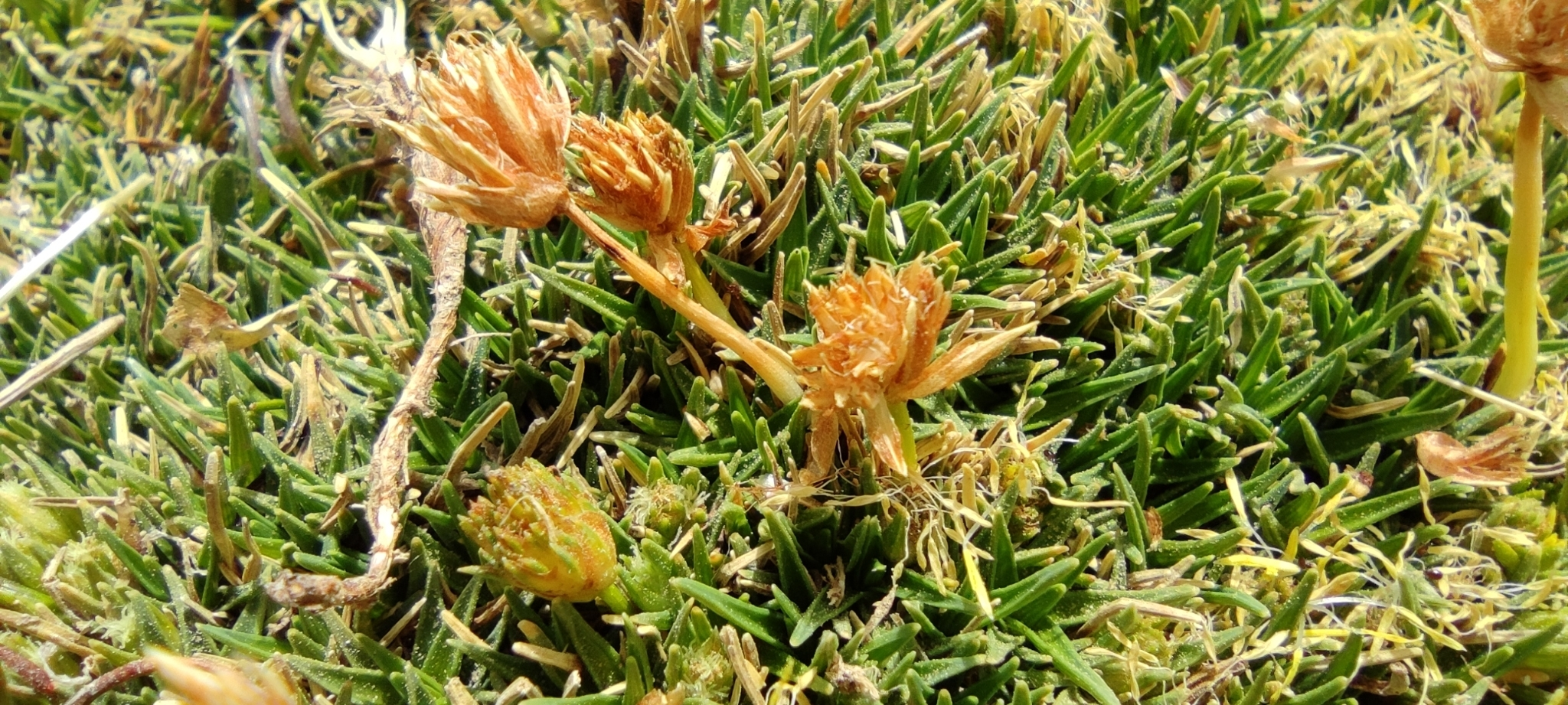
- P. deserticola

Scientific classification
- Kingdom: Plantae
- Clade: Tracheophytes
- Clade: Angiosperms
- Clade: Monocots
- Clade: Commelinids
- Order: Poales
- Family: Cyperaceae
- Genus: Phylloscirpus; C.B.Clarke

= Phylloscirpus =

Genus of plants

Phylloscirpus is a genus of flowering plants belonging to the family Cyperaceae.

Its native range is Ecuador to western Argentina.

== Species ==
Three species are accepted:

- Phylloscirpus acaulis (Phil.) Goetgh. & D.A.Simpson
- Phylloscirpus boliviensis (Barros) Dhooge & Goetgh.
- Phylloscirpus deserticola (Phil.) Dhooge & Goetgh.
