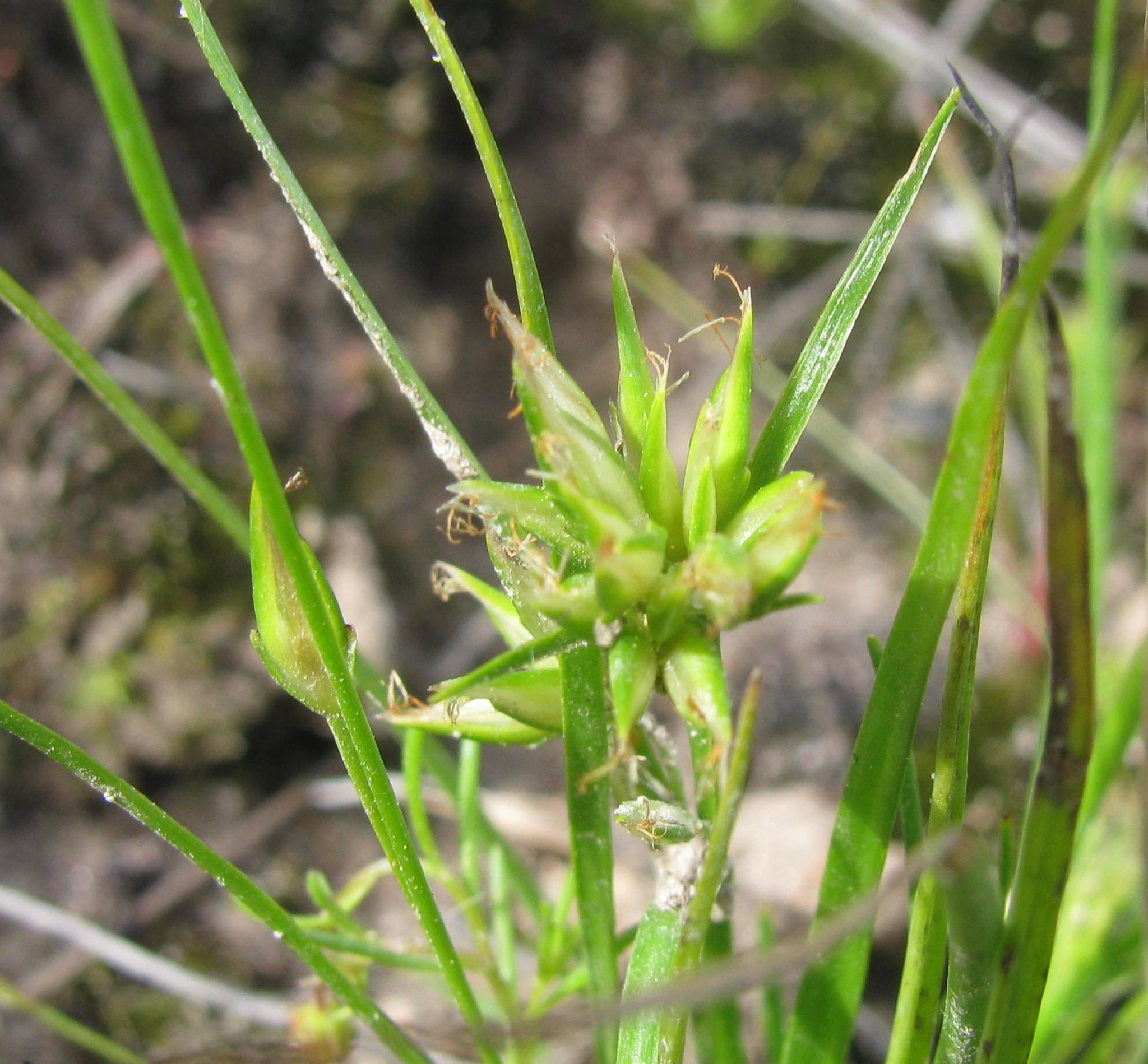
- T. stipitata

Scientific classification
- Kingdom: Plantae
- Clade: Tracheophytes
- Clade: Angiosperms
- Clade: Monocots
- Clade: Commelinids
- Order: Poales
- Family: Cyperaceae
- Genus: Trianoptiles; Fenzl ex Endl.

= Trianoptiles =

Genus of flowering plants

Trianoptiles is a genus of flowering plants belonging to the family Cyperaceae. They are commonly known as Capesedges. The genus is endemic to South Africa.

Species:

- Trianoptiles capensis (Steud.) Harv.
- Trianoptiles solitaria (C.B.Clarke) Levyns
- Trianoptiles stipitata Levyns
