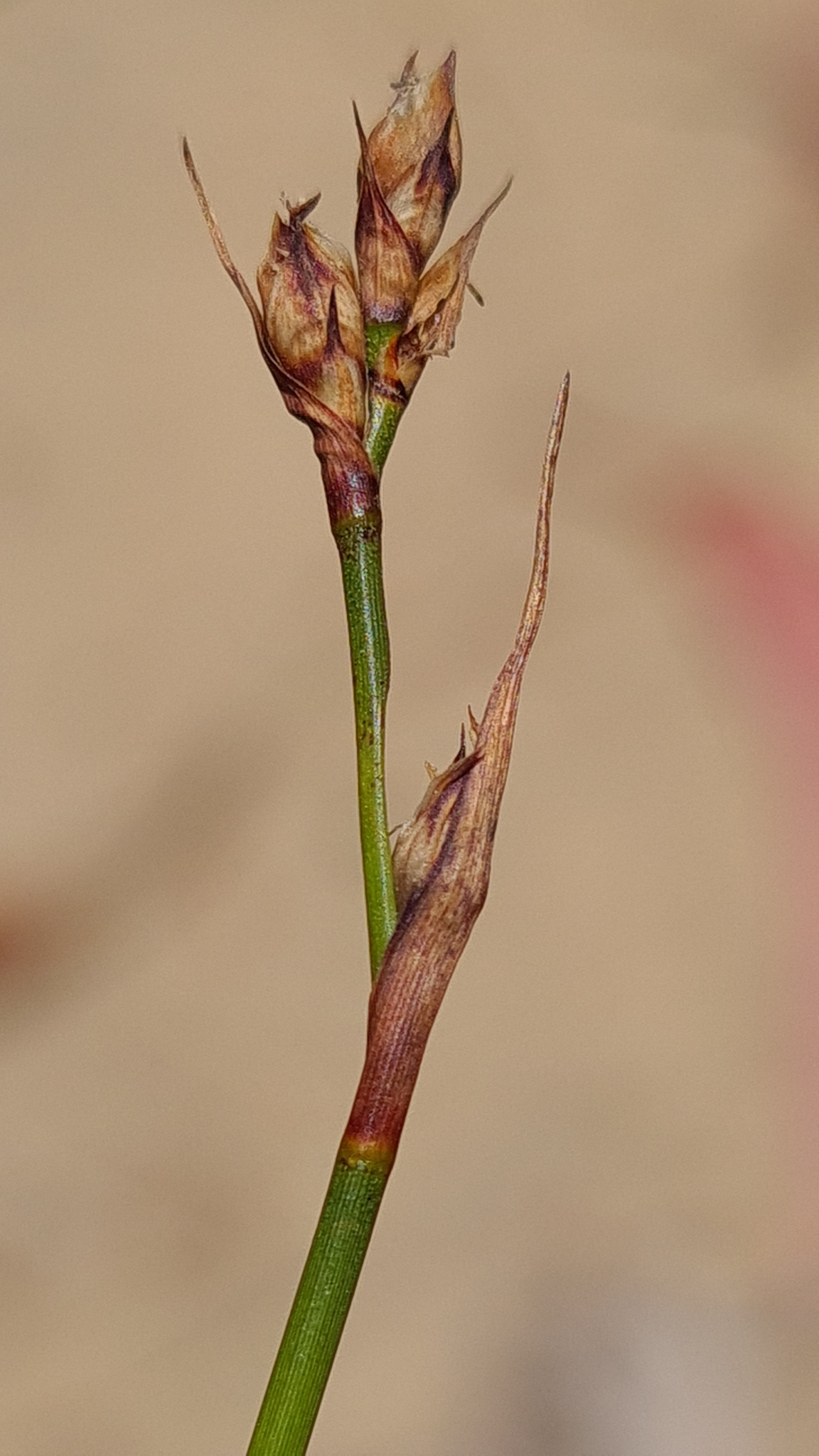
- Tricostularia pauciflora

Scientific classification
- Kingdom: Plantae
- Clade: Tracheophytes
- Clade: Angiosperms
- Clade: Monocots
- Clade: Commelinids
- Order: Poales
- Family: Cyperaceae
- Genus: Tricostularia; Nees ex Lehm.

Synonyms
- Discopodium Steud.

= Tricostularia =

Genus of flowering plants

Tricostularia is a genus of flowering plants belonging to the family Cyperaceae. All species of the genus Tricostularia are endemic to Australia.

== Species ==
The following species are recognised in the genus Tricostularia:

- Tricostularia aphylla (R.Br.) K.L.Wilson & R.L.Barrett
- Tricostularia bennettiana R.L.Barrett & K.L.Wilson
- Tricostularia compressa Nees ex Lehm.
- Tricostularia davisii R.L.Barrett & K.L.Wilson
- Tricostularia drummondii (Steud.) R.L.Barrett & K.L.Wilson
- Tricostularia exsul (C.B.Clarke) K.L.Wilson & R.L.Barrett
- Tricostularia lepschii R.L.Barrett & K.L.Wilson
- Tricostularia neesii Lehm.
- Tricostularia newbeyi R.L.Barrett & K.L.Wilson
- Tricostularia pauciflora (R.Br.) Benth.
- Tricostularia sandifordiana R.L.Barrett & K.L.Wilson
