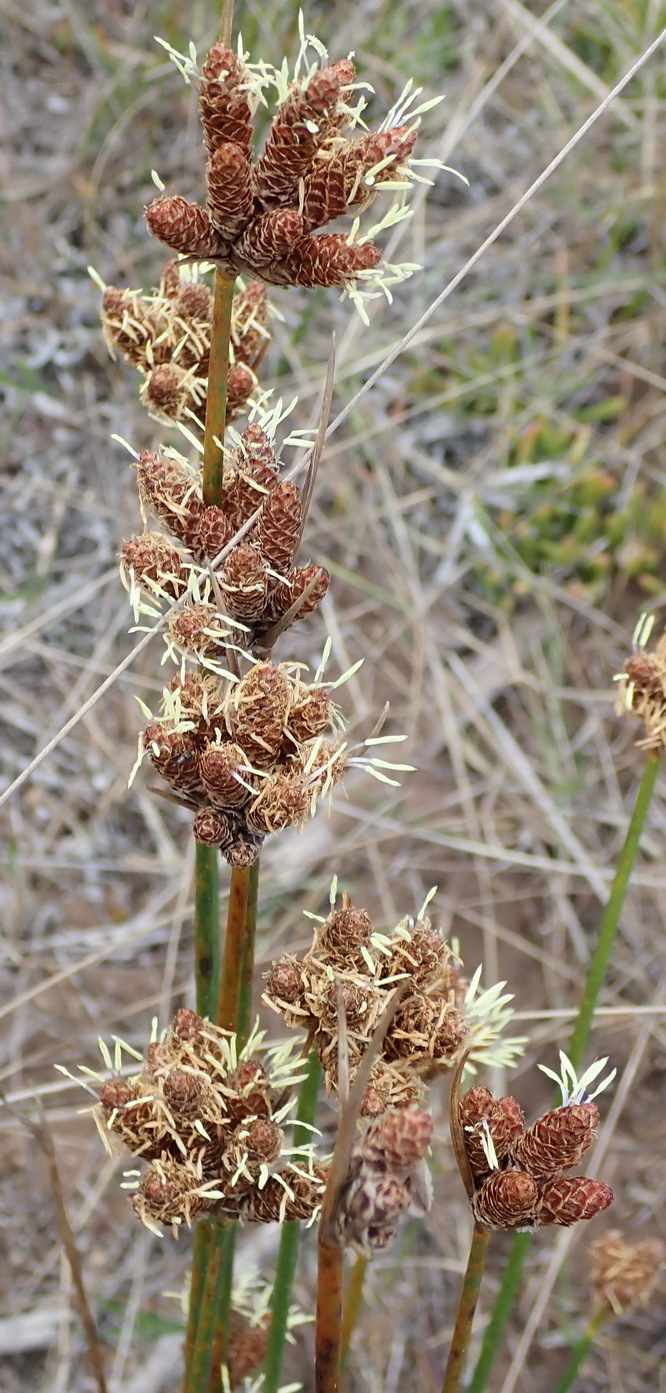

Scientific classification
- Kingdom: Plantae
- Clade: Tracheophytes
- Clade: Angiosperms
- Clade: Monocots
- Clade: Commelinids
- Order: Poales
- Family: Cyperaceae
- Genus: Hellmuthia; Steud.
- Species: H. membranacea

Binomial name
- Hellmuthia membranacea (Thunb.) R.W.Haines & Lye

Synonyms
- Ficinia canaliculata H.Pfeiff.; Ficinia membranacea (Thunb.) Kunth; Hellmuthia restioides Steud.; Scirpus membranaceus Thunb.

= Hellmuthia =

Genus of plants

Hellmuthia is a monotypic genus of flowering plants belonging to the family Cyperaceae. The only species is Hellmuthia membranacea.

It is native to the Cape Provinces within the South African Republic.

The genus name of Hellmuthia is in honour of Hellmuth Steudel (1816–1886), German doctor in Esslingen and son of Ernst Gottlieb von Steudel (a German physician and an authority on grasses). The Latin specific epithet of membranaceus means membranous. Hellmuthia membranacea was first described and published in Bot. Not. Vol.129 on page 66 in 1976.
