= Zulustylis =

Scientific classification
- Kingdom: Plantae
- Clade: Tracheophytes
- Clade: Angiosperms
- Clade: Monocots
- Clade: Commelinids
- Order: Poales
- Family: Cyperaceae
- Subfamily: Cyperoideae
- Tribe: Abildgaardieae
- Genus: Zulustylis; Muasya

Species
- Zulustylis hygrophila (Gordon-Gray) Muasya; Zulustylis variegata (Gordon-Gray) Muasya

Genus of flowering plants

Zulustylis is a genus of flowering plants in the family Cyperaceae. It includes two species of sedges native to central and southern Africa.

- Zulustylis hygrophila (Gordon-Gray) Muasya – southern Tanzania to the Cape Provinces of South Africa
- Zulustylis variegata (Gordon-Gray) Muasya – KwaZulu-Natal
