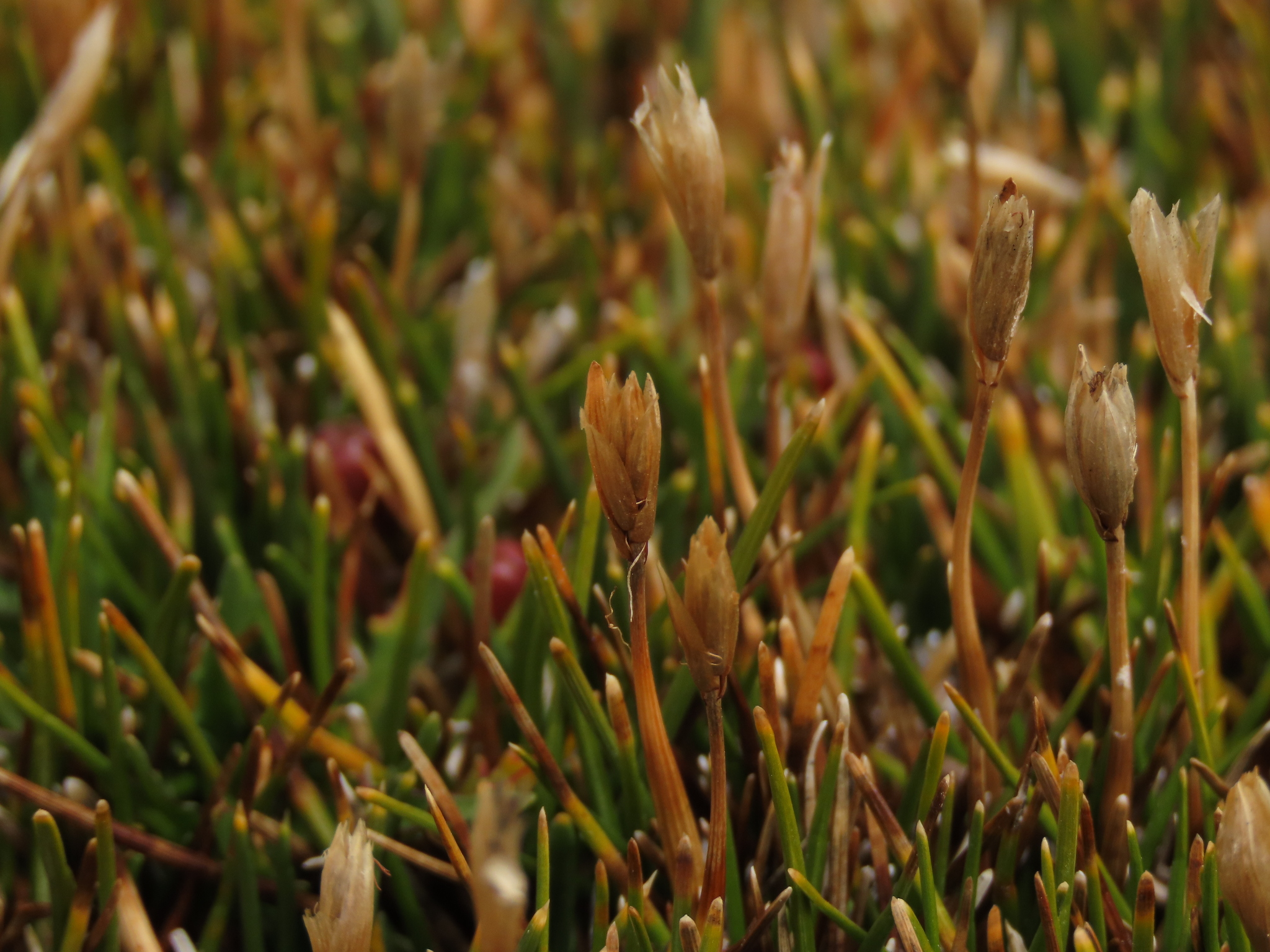
- Zameioscirpus atacamensis in Tarapacá, northern Chile

Scientific classification
- Kingdom: Plantae
- Clade: Tracheophytes
- Clade: Angiosperms
- Clade: Monocots
- Clade: Commelinids
- Order: Poales
- Family: Cyperaceae
- Genus: Zameioscirpus; Dhooge & Goetgh.

= Zameioscirpus =

Genus of flowering plants

Zameioscirpus is a genus of flowering plants belonging to the family Cyperaceae.

It is native to Peru, Bolivia, Chile and Western Argentina.

Species:

- Zameioscirpus atacamensis (Phil.) Dhooge & Goetgh.
- Zameioscirpus gaimardioides (É.Desv.) Dhooge & Goetgh.
- Zameioscirpus muticus Dhooge & Goetgh.
