= Sumatroscirpus =

Scientific classification
- Kingdom: Plantae
- Clade: Tracheophytes
- Clade: Angiosperms
- Clade: Monocots
- Clade: Commelinids
- Order: Poales
- Family: Cyperaceae
- Genus: Sumatroscirpus; Oteng-Yeb.

Genus of plants

Sumatroscirpus is a genus of flowering plants belonging to the family Cyperaceae.

Its native range is Southern Central China to Indo-China, Sumatera.

Species:

- Sumatroscirpus junghuhnii (Miq.) Oteng-Yeb.
- Sumatroscirpus minor (Kük.) Lév.-Bourret & J.R.Starr
- Sumatroscirpus paniculatocorymbosus (Kük.) Lév.-Bourret & J.R.Starr
- Sumatroscirpus rupestris Lév.-Bourret & J.R.Starr
