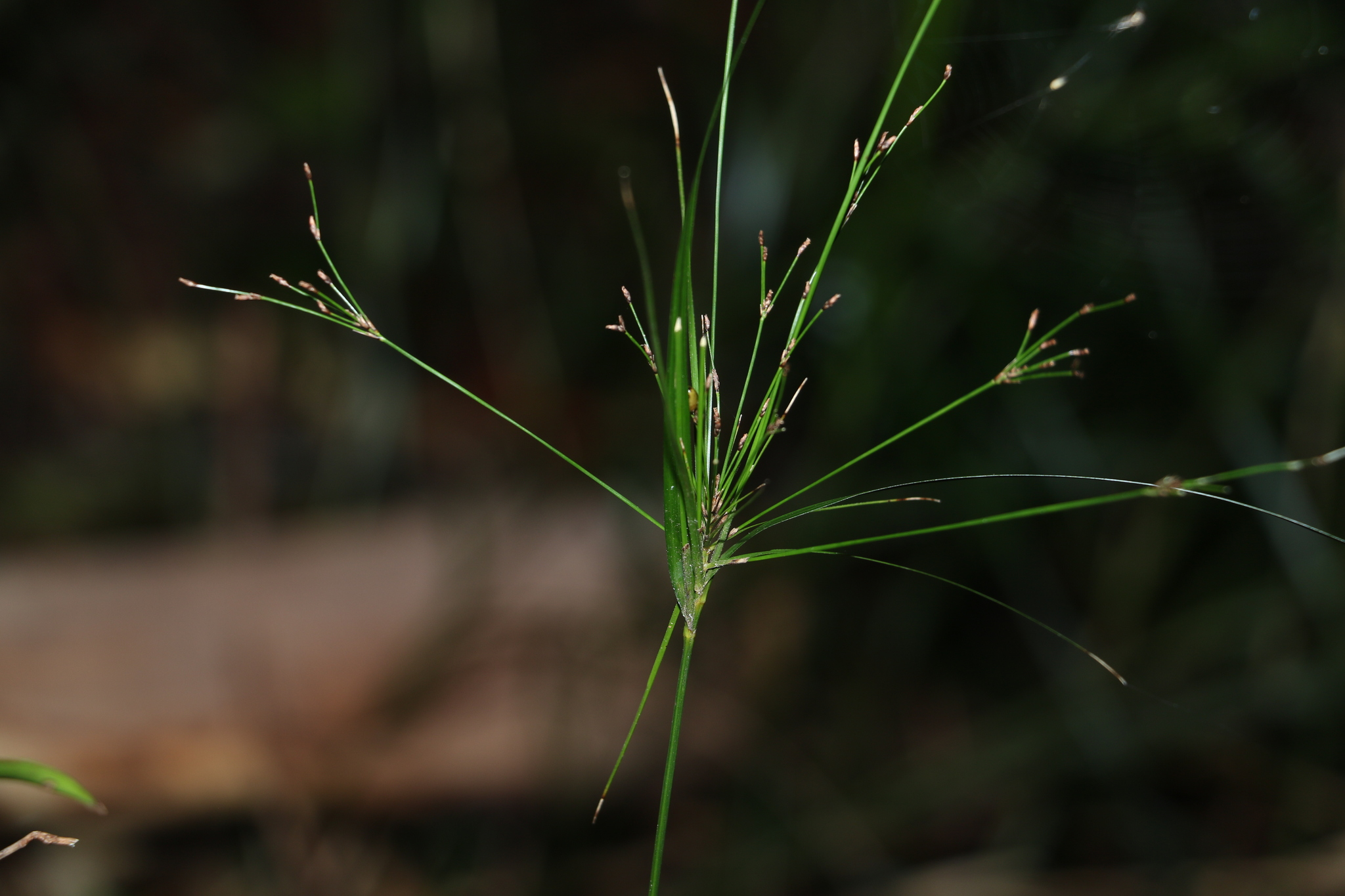

Scientific classification
- Kingdom: Plantae
- Clade: Tracheophytes
- Clade: Angiosperms
- Clade: Monocots
- Clade: Commelinids
- Order: Poales
- Family: Cyperaceae
- Genus: Exocarya; Benth.
- Species: E. scleroides

Binomial name
- Exocarya scleroides (F.Muell.) Benth.

Synonyms
- Cladium scleroides F.Muell.; Exocarya montivaga Domin; Scleria ustulata F.M.Bailey

= Exocarya =

Genus of plants

Exocarya is a monotypic genus of flowering plants belonging to the family Cyperaceae. It contains a single species, Exocarya sclerioides, a grass like plant native to New Guinea, Queensland, and northeastern New South Wales.

This species first appeared in the scientific literature in 1875 when it was described as Cladium sclerioides by Ferdinand von Mueller. In 1877 the systematic botanist George Bentham transferred it to genus Exocarya as E. sclerioides.
