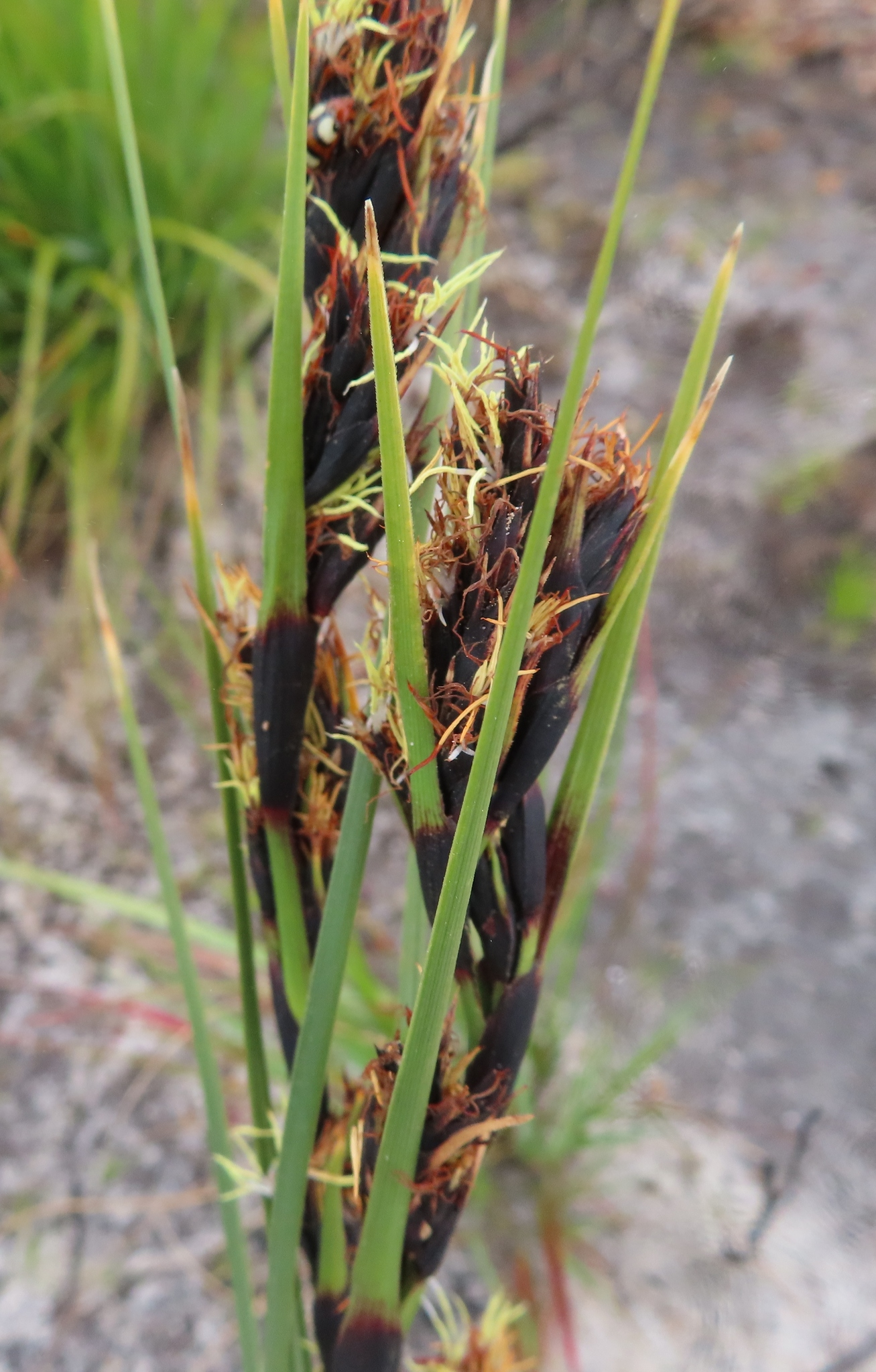
- Cyathocoma hexandra

Scientific classification
- Kingdom: Plantae
- Clade: Tracheophytes
- Clade: Angiosperms
- Clade: Monocots
- Clade: Commelinids
- Order: Poales
- Family: Cyperaceae
- Genus: Cyathocoma; Nees

= Cyathocoma =

Genus of flowering plants

Cyathocoma is a genus of flowering plants belonging to the family Cyperaceae. It includes three species native to the Cape Provinces and KwaZulu-Natal in South Africa.

== Species ==
Three species are accepted.

- Cyathocoma bachmannii (Kük.) C.Archer
- Cyathocoma ecklonii Nees
- Cyathocoma hexandra (Nees) Browning
