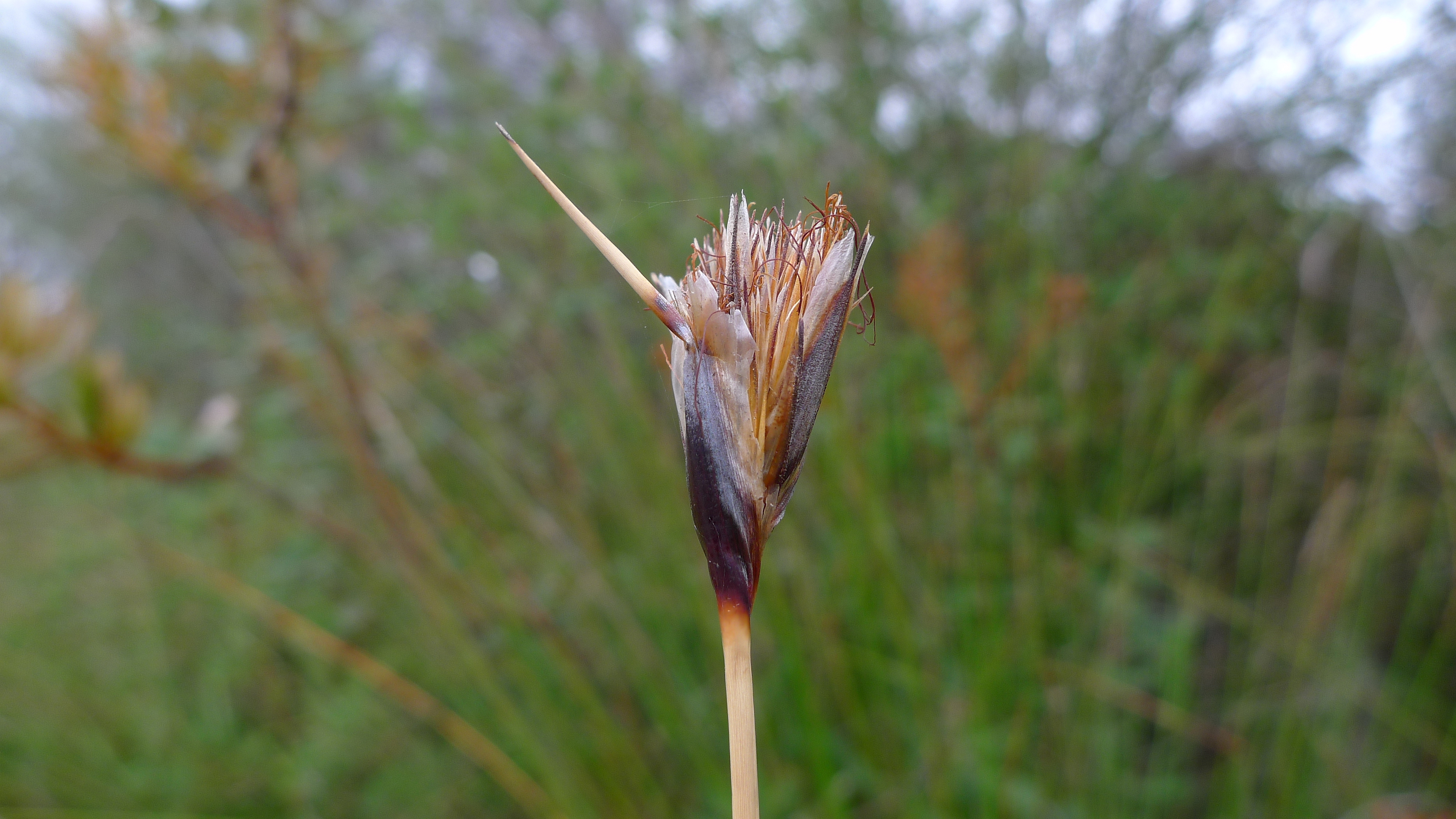
- Royal National Park, Australia

Scientific classification
- Kingdom: Plantae
- Clade: Tracheophytes
- Clade: Angiosperms
- Clade: Monocots
- Clade: Commelinids
- Order: Poales
- Family: Cyperaceae
- Genus: Ptilothrix
- Species: P. deusta

Binomial name
- Ptilothrix deusta (R.Br.) K.L.Wilson

Synonyms
- Carpha deusta R.Br. Chaetospora deusta (R.Br.) F.Muell. Mesomelaena deusta (R.Br.) Benth. Ptilanthelium deustum (R.Br.) Kük. Rhynchospora deusta (R.Br.) Spreng. Schoenus deustus (R.Br.) F.Muell.

= Ptilothrix deusta =

Species of grass-like plant

Ptilothrix deusta is a sedge in the family Cyperaceae found in south eastern Australia. It is the sole species in genus Ptilothrix. It is commonly seen in wet sandy soils in heathland, growing from 30 to 60 cm tall. This is one of the many plant species first published by Robert Brown with the type known as "(J.) v.v." appearing in his Prodromus Florae Novae Hollandiae et Insulae Van Diemen in 1810 as Carpha deusta. In 1994 Karen Wilson transferred the species to the genus Ptilothrix. The genus name is derived from ancient Greek, meaning feather hair. The specific epithet deusta is derived from the Latin with a meaning of burnt.
