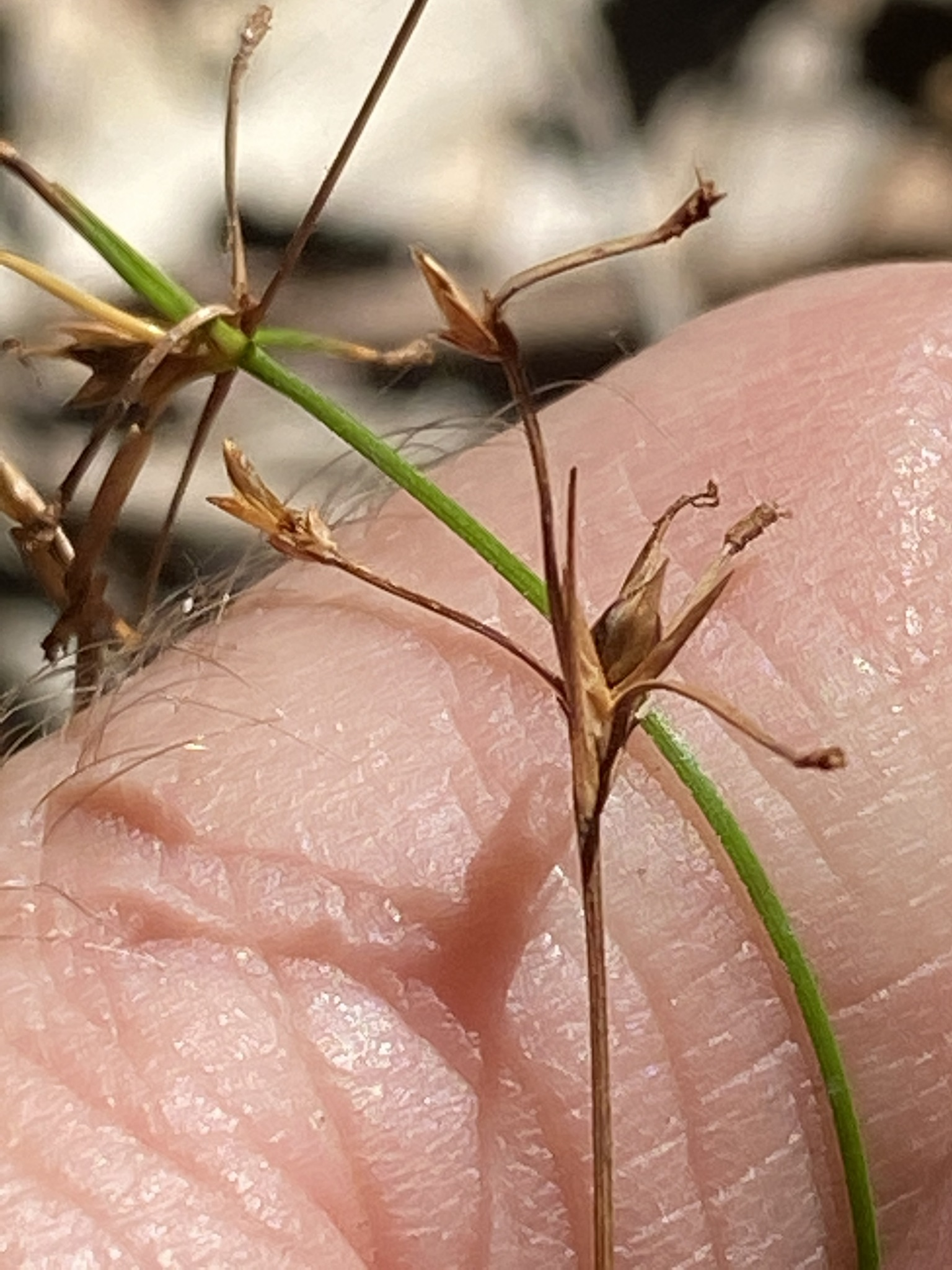

Scientific classification
- Kingdom: Plantae
- Clade: Tracheophytes
- Clade: Angiosperms
- Clade: Monocots
- Clade: Commelinids
- Order: Poales
- Family: Cyperaceae
- Genus: Trachystylis; S.T.Blake
- Species: T. stradbrokensis

Binomial name
- Trachystylis stradbrokensis (Domin) Kük.

Synonyms
- Cladium stradbrokense Domin (1915) (basionym); Fimbristylis stradbrokensis (Domin) J.Kern; Machaerina stradbrokensis (Domin) T.Koyama; Trachystylis foliosa S.T.Blake

= Trachystylis =

Genus of flowering plants

Trachystylis is a monotypic genus of flowering plants belonging to the family Cyperaceae. The single species is Trachystylis stradbrokensis (Domin) Kok, which is endemic to Australia (Queensland).
