= Ammothryon =

Scientific classification
- Kingdom: Plantae
- Clade: Tracheophytes
- Clade: Angiosperms
- Clade: Monocots
- Clade: Commelinids
- Order: Poales
- Family: Cyperaceae
- Genus: Ammothryon; R.L.Barrett, K.L.Wilson & J.J.Bruhl
- Species: A. grandiflorum

Binomial name
- Ammothryon grandiflorum (Nees ex Lehm.) R.L.Barrett, K.L.Wilson & J.J.Bruhl

Synonyms
- Elynanthus grandiflorus Nees ex Lehm.; Schoenus grandiflorus (Nees ex Lehm.) F.Muell.

Genus of flowering plants

Ammothryon is a genus of sedges in the family Cyperaceae. It includes a single species, Ammothryon grandiflorum, a perennial rhizomatous geophyte native to Southwest Australia.

The species was first described as Elynanthus grandiflorus in 1844. In 2021 Russell Lindsay Barrett, Karen Louise Wilson, and Jeremy James Bruhl placed it in the newly-described genus Ammothryon as Ammothryon grandiflorum.
