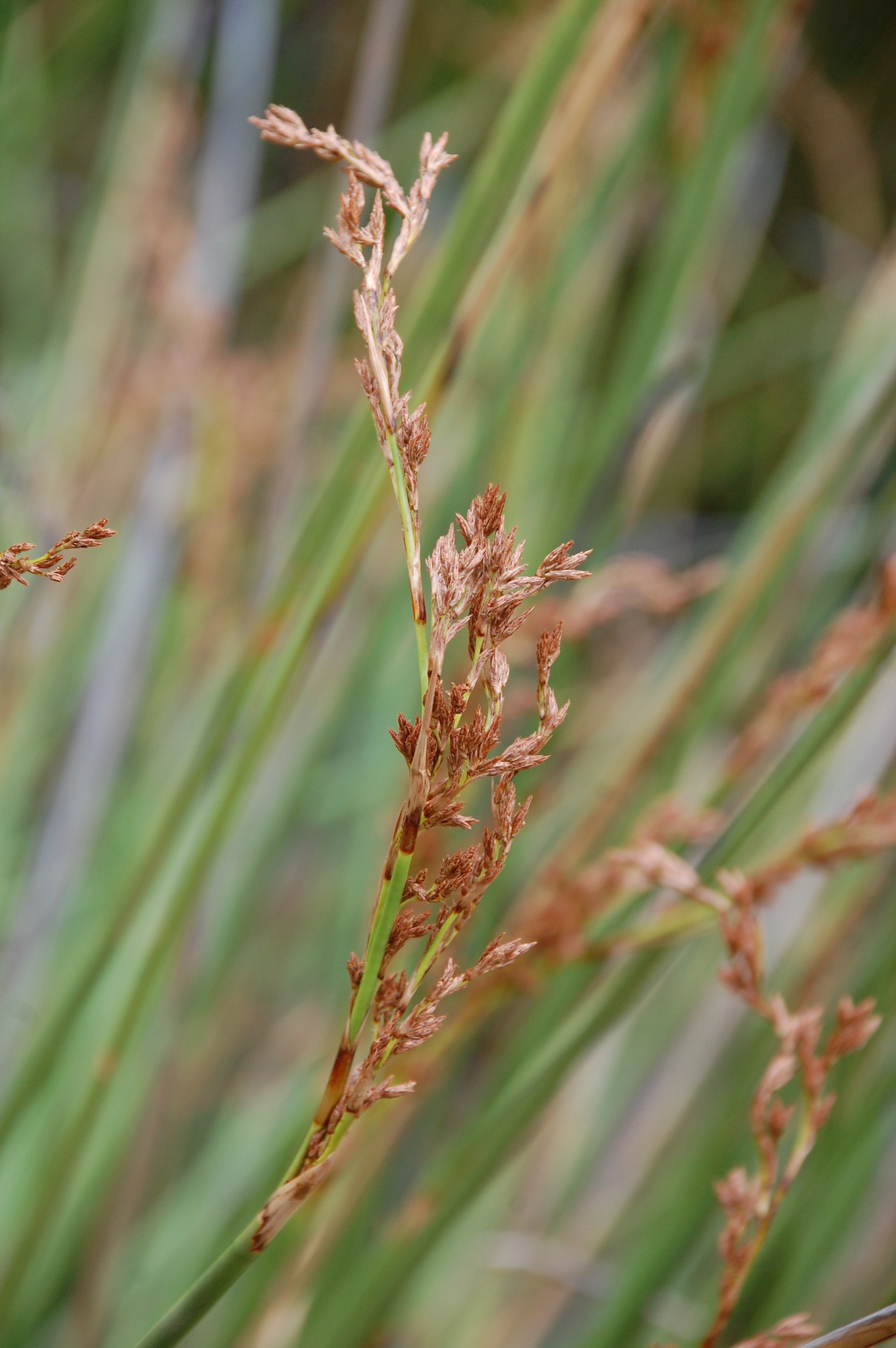

Scientific classification
- Kingdom: Plantae
- Clade: Tracheophytes
- Clade: Angiosperms
- Clade: Monocots
- Clade: Commelinids
- Order: Poales
- Family: Cyperaceae
- Genus: Pseudoschoenus (C.B.Clarke) Oteng-Yeb.
- Species: P. inanis

Binomial name
- Pseudoschoenus inanis (Thunb.) Oteng-Yeb.

Synonyms
- Schoenus inanis Thunb.; Scirpus inanis (Thunb.) Steud.; Scirpus spathaceus Hochst.

= Pseudoschoenus =

Genus of plants

Pseudoschoenus is a monotypic genus of flowering plants belonging to the family Cyperaceae. The only species is Pseudoschoenus inanis, a perennial sedge which is native to the Cape Provinces, Free State, Lesotho, and Namibia in southern Africa.
