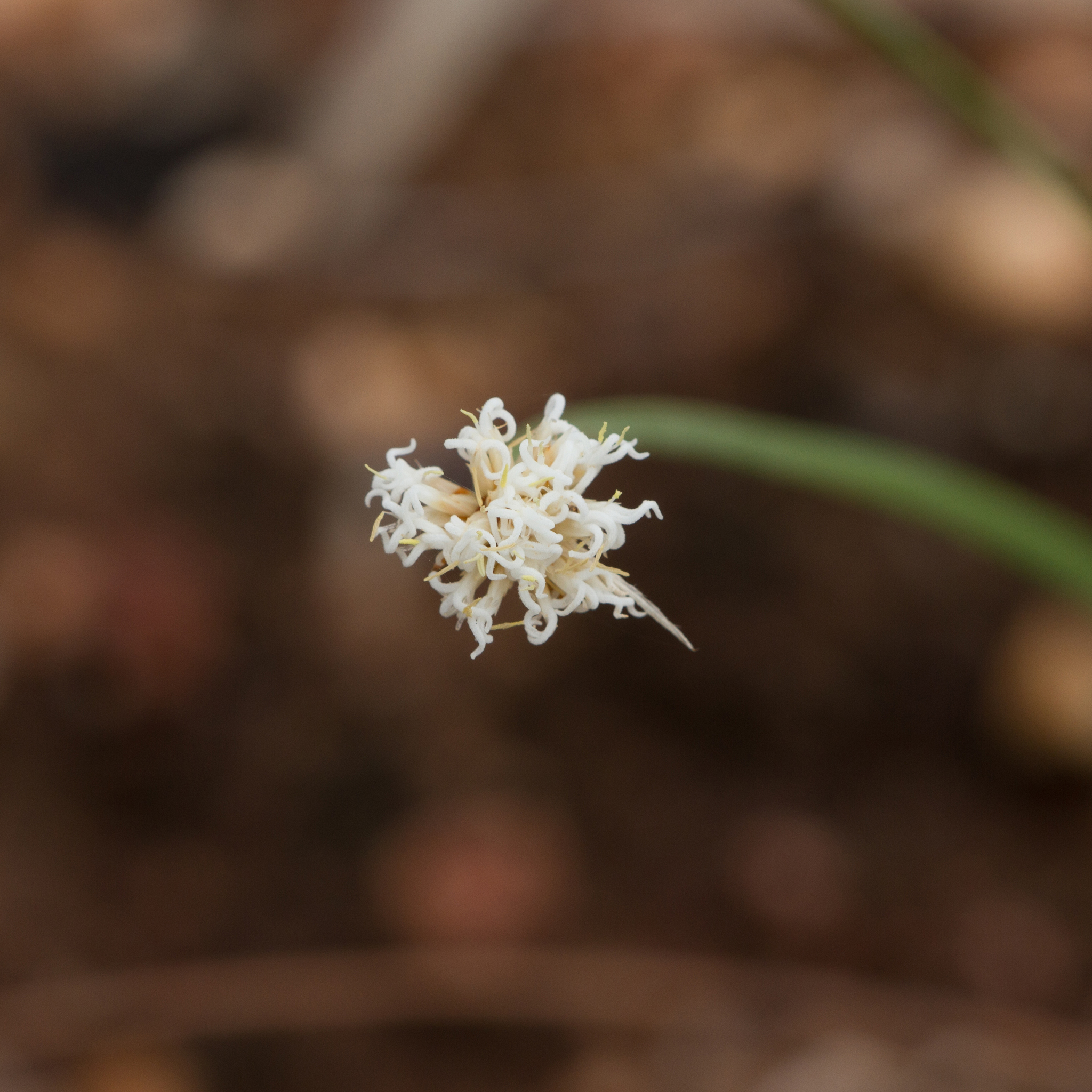
- Arthrostylis aphylla

Scientific classification
- Kingdom: Plantae
- Clade: Tracheophytes
- Clade: Angiosperms
- Clade: Monocots
- Clade: Commelinids
- Order: Poales
- Family: Cyperaceae
- Tribe: Abildgaardieae
- Genus: Arthrostylis; R.Br.

= Arthrostylis =

Genus of flowering plants

Arthrostylis is a genus of flowering plants belonging to the family Cyperaceae. It includes two species of sedges native to northern Australia.

- Arthrostylis aphylla R.Br.
- Arthrostylis planiculmis (Boeckeler) R.L.Barrett & K.L.Wilson
