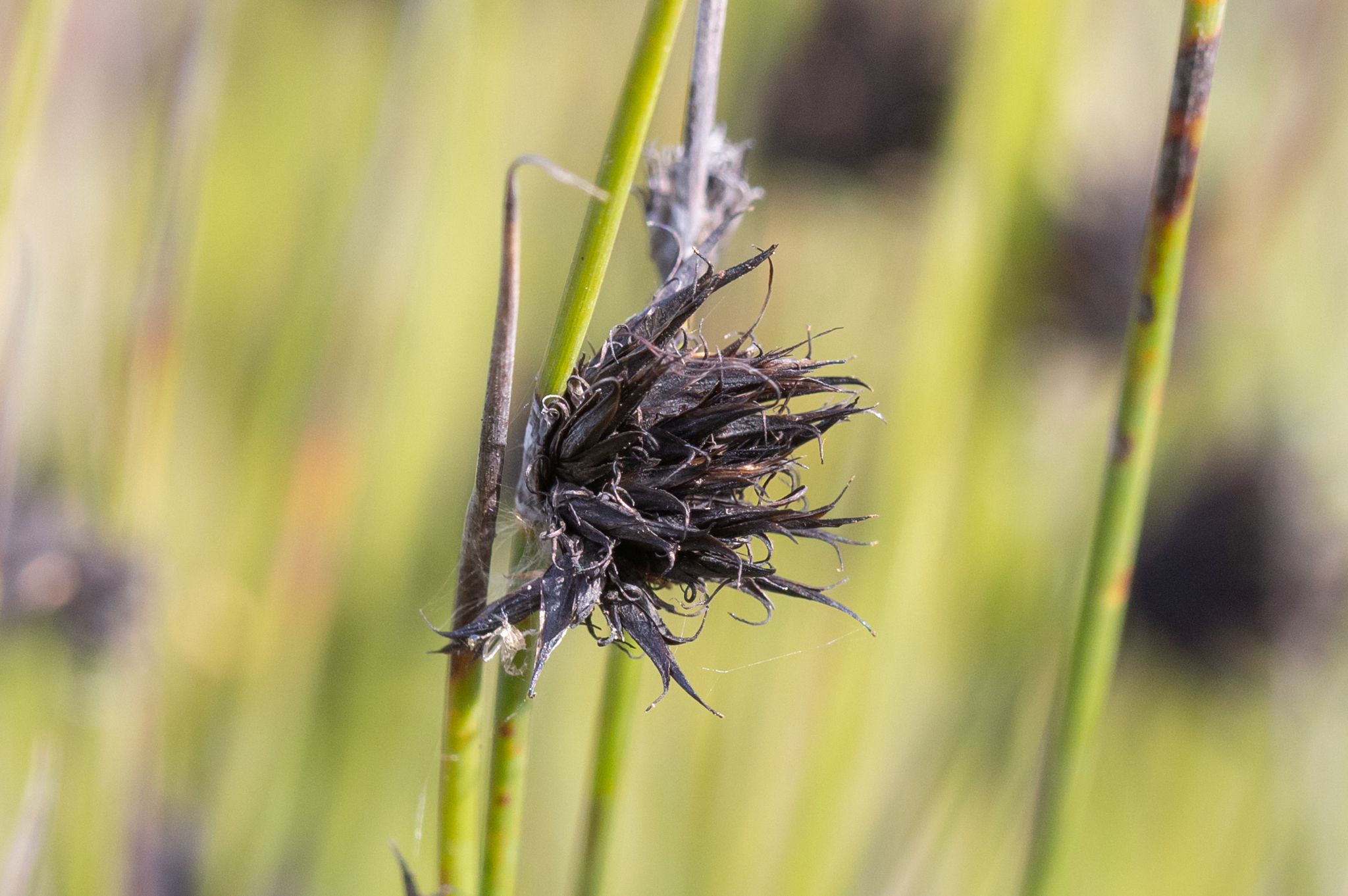
- Mesomelaena stygia

Scientific classification
- Kingdom: Plantae
- Clade: Tracheophytes
- Clade: Angiosperms
- Clade: Monocots
- Clade: Commelinids
- Order: Poales
- Family: Cyperaceae
- Genus: Mesomelaena; Nees

= Mesomelaena =

Genus of grass-like plants

Mesomelaena is a genus of sedges. It has 5 known species, all endemic to Western Australia.

Species:

- Mesomelaena graciliceps (C.B.Clarke) K.L.Wilson
- Mesomelaena preissii Nees
- Mesomelaena pseudostygia K.L.Wilson
- Mesomelaena stygia (R.Br.) Nees
- Mesomelaena tetragona (R.Br.) Benth. - Semaphore Sedge
