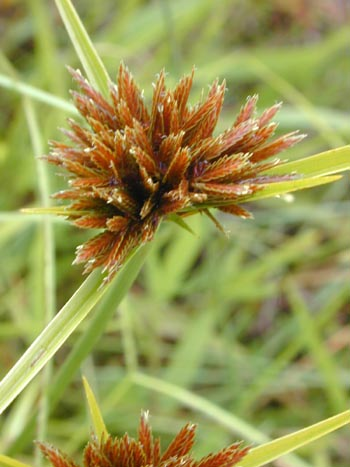
- Cyperus polystachyos flower head

Scientific classification
- Kingdom: Plantae
- Clade: Tracheophytes
- Clade: Angiosperms
- Clade: Monocots
- Clade: Commelinids
- Order: Poales
- Family: Cyperaceae; Juss.

Genera
- 95 genera as of July 2025

= Cyperaceae =

Cyperaceae Temporal range: Cretaceous – Recent

Flowering plants known as sedges

The Cyperaceae (/ˌsaɪpəˈreɪsi.iː, -ˌaɪ/) are a family of graminoid (grass-like), monocotyledonous flowering plants known as sedges. The family contains around 5,500 described species in about 90 genera, the largest with over 2,000 species being the "true sedges" or Carex.

== Distribution ==
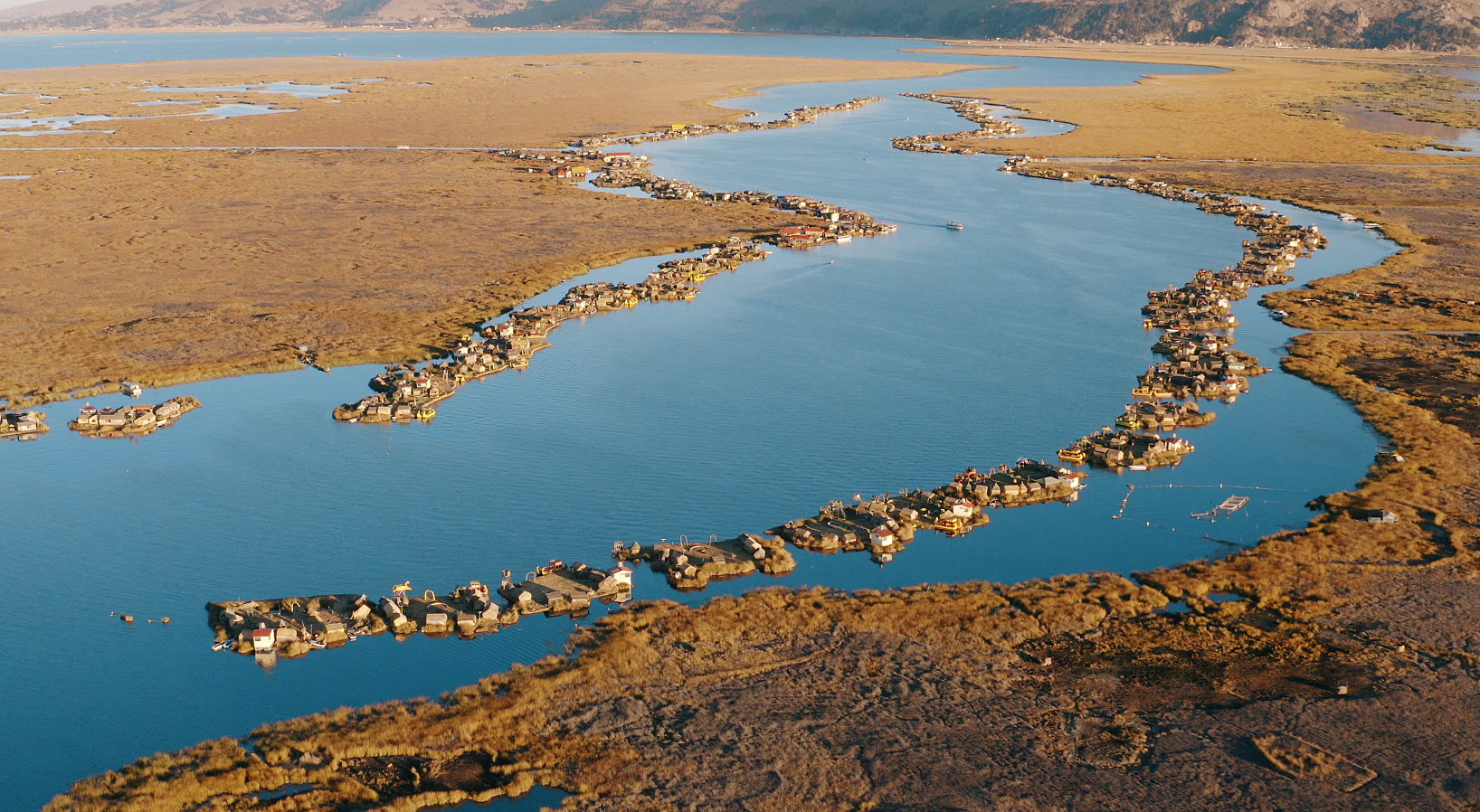
Artificial floating island communities made of totora by the Uru peoples in Lake Titicaca

Species richness map of the Cyperaceae family across WGSRPD botanical countries, with the highest in South Central China (460 species). Most species prefer temperate climates.

Cyperaceae species are widely distributed with the centers of diversity for the group occurring in East Asia, although most species globally prefer temperate climates. While sedges grow in almost all environments, many thrive in wetlands or in poor soils. Ecological communities dominated by sedges are known as sedgelands or as sedge meadows.

== Classification ==
Some species superficially resemble the closely related rushes and the more distantly related grasses. Features distinguishing members of the sedge family from grasses or rushes are stems with triangular cross-sections (with occasional exceptions, a notable example being the tule that has a round cross-section) and leaves that are spirally arranged in three ranks. In comparison, grasses have alternate leaves, forming two ranks. This difference leads to the mnemonic "sedges have edges" in order to tell them apart from generally round rushes or hollow, noded grasses.

Some well-known sedges include the water chestnut (Eleocharis dulcis) and the papyrus sedge (Cyperus papyrus), from which the writing material papyrus was made. This family also includes cotton-grass (Eriophorum), spike-rush (Eleocharis), sawgrass (Cladium), nutsedge or nutgrass (also called chufa, Cyperus esculentus/Cyperus rotundus, a cultivated crop and common weed), white star sedge (Rhynchospora colorata), and umbrella sedge (Cyperus alternifolius), also known as umbrella papyrus

== Features ==
Members of this family are characterised by the formation of dauciform (carrot-like) roots that are an alteration in root morphology that researchers regard as analogous to cluster roots in Proteaceae, which help uptake of nutrients such as phosphorus from poor soil. Like other members of the order Poales, sedges are mostly wind-pollinated, but there are exceptions. Cyperus niveus and Cyperus sphaerocephalus, both with accordingly more conspicuous flowers, are insect-pollinated.

== Evolution ==
Researchers have identified prominent sedges occurring at least as early as the Eocene epoch. Earlier fossils date to the Late Cretaceous.

== Genera ==
As of July 2025, 95 genera are accepted by Kew's Plants of the World Online.

- Abildgaardia Vahl
- Actinoschoenus Benth.
- Actinoscirpus (Ohwi) R.W.Haines & Lye
- Afroscirpoides García-Madr. & Muasya
- Afrotrilepis (Gilly) J.Raynal
- Ammothryon R.L.Barrett, K.L.Wilson & J.J.Bruhl
- Amphiscirpus Oteng-Yeb.
- Anthelepis R.L.Barrett, K.L.Wilson & J.J.Bruhl
- Arthrostylis R.Br.
- Asterochaete Nees
- Becquerelia Brongn.
- Bisboeckelera Kuntze
- Blysmus Panz. ex Schult.
- × Bolboschoenoplectus Tatanov
- Bolboschoenus (Asch.) Palla
- Bulbostylis Kunth
- Calliscirpus C.N.Gilmour, J.R.Starr & Naczi
- Calyptrocarya Nees
- Capeobolus Browning
- Capitularina J.Kern
- Carex L.
- Carpha Banks & Sol. ex R.Br.
- Caustis R.Br.
- Cephalocarpus Nees (synonym Everardia Ridl.)
- Chaetospora R.Br.
- Chamaedendron (Kük.) Larridon
- Chorizandra R.Br.
- Chrysitrix L.
- Cladium P.Browne
- Coleochloa Gilly
- Costularia C.B.Clarke
- Cryptangium Schrad. ex Nees
- Cyathochaeta Nees
- Cyathocoma Nees
- Cyperus L.
- Didymiandrum Gilly
- Diplacrum R.Br.
- Diplasia Pers.
- Dracoscirpoides Muasya
- Dulichium Pers.
- Eleocharis R.Br.
- Eriophorum L.
- Erioscirpus Palla
- Evandra R.Br.
- Exocarya Benth.
- Exochogyne C.B.Clarke
- Ficinia Schrad.
- Fimbristylis Vahl
- Fuirena Rottb.
- Gahnia J.R.Forst. & G.Forst.
- Gymnoschoenus Nees
- Hellmuthia Steud.
- Hypolytrum Pers.
- Isolepis R.Br.
- Khaosokia D.A.Simpson, Chayam. & J.Parn.
- Koyamaea W.W.Thomas & G.Davidse
- Krenakia S.M.Costa
- Lagenocarpus Nees
- Lepidosperma Labill.
- Lepironia Pers.
- Machaerina Vahl
- Mapania Aubl.
- Mesomelaena Nees
- Microdracoides Hua
- Morelotia Gaudich.
- Neesenbeckia Levyns
- Nelmesia Van der Veken
- Netrostylis R.L.Barrett, J.J.Bruhl & K.L.Wilson
- Oreobolus R.Br.
- Paramapania Uittien
- Phylloscirpus C.B.Clarke
- Pseudoschoenus (C.B.Clarke) Oteng-Yeb.
- Ptilothrix K.L.Wilson
- Reedia F.Muell.
- Rhodoscirpus Léveillé-Bourret, Donadío & J.R.Starr
- Rhynchocladium T.Koyama
- Rhynchospora Vahl
- Schoenoplectiella Lye
- Schoenoplectus (Rchb.) Palla
- Schoenus L.
- Scirpodendron Zipp. ex Kurz
- Scirpoides Ség.
- Scirpus Tourn. ex L.
- Scleria P.J.Bergius
- Scleroschoenus K.L.Wilson, J.J.Bruhl & R.L.Barrett
- Sumatroscirpus Oteng-Yeb.
- Tetraria P.Beauv.
- Trachystylis S.T.Blake
- Trianoptiles Fenzl ex Endl.
- Trichophorum Pers.
- Trichoschoenus J.Raynal
- Tricostularia Nees
- Trilepis Nees
- Xyroschoenus Larridon
- Zameioscirpus Dhooge & Goetgh.
- Zulustylis Muasya
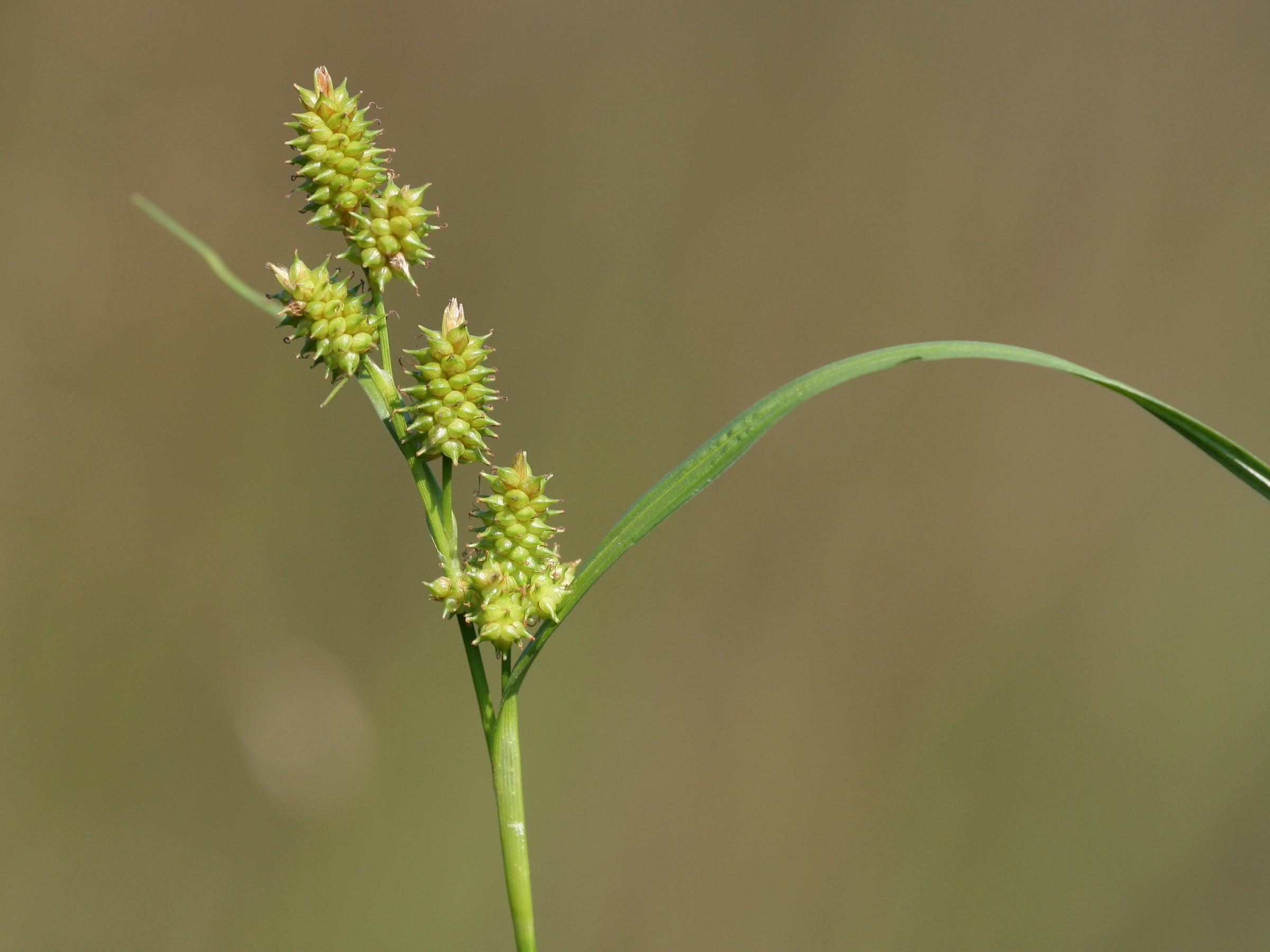
Carex demissa

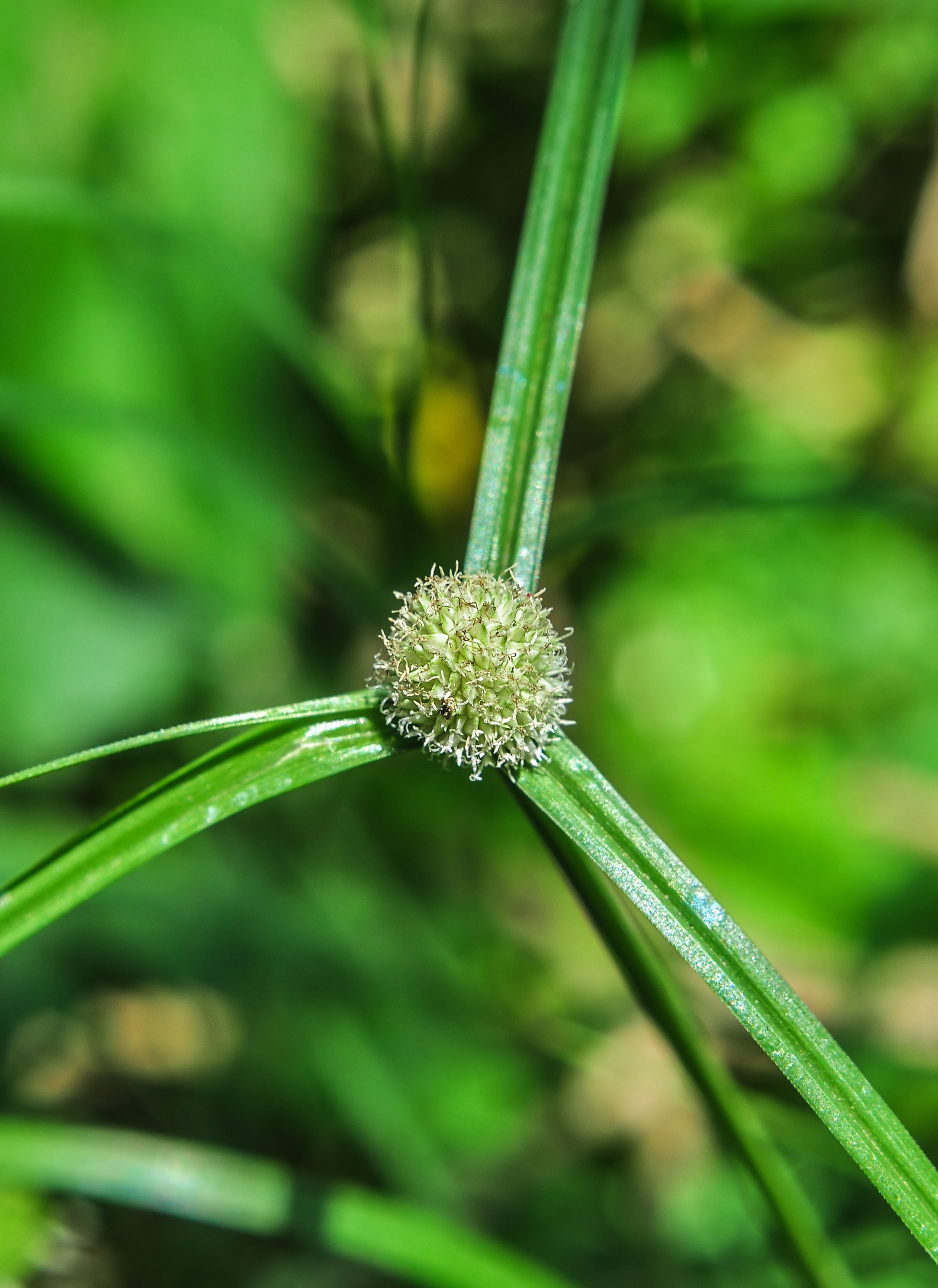
Cyperus brevifolioides (Kyllinga gracillima)

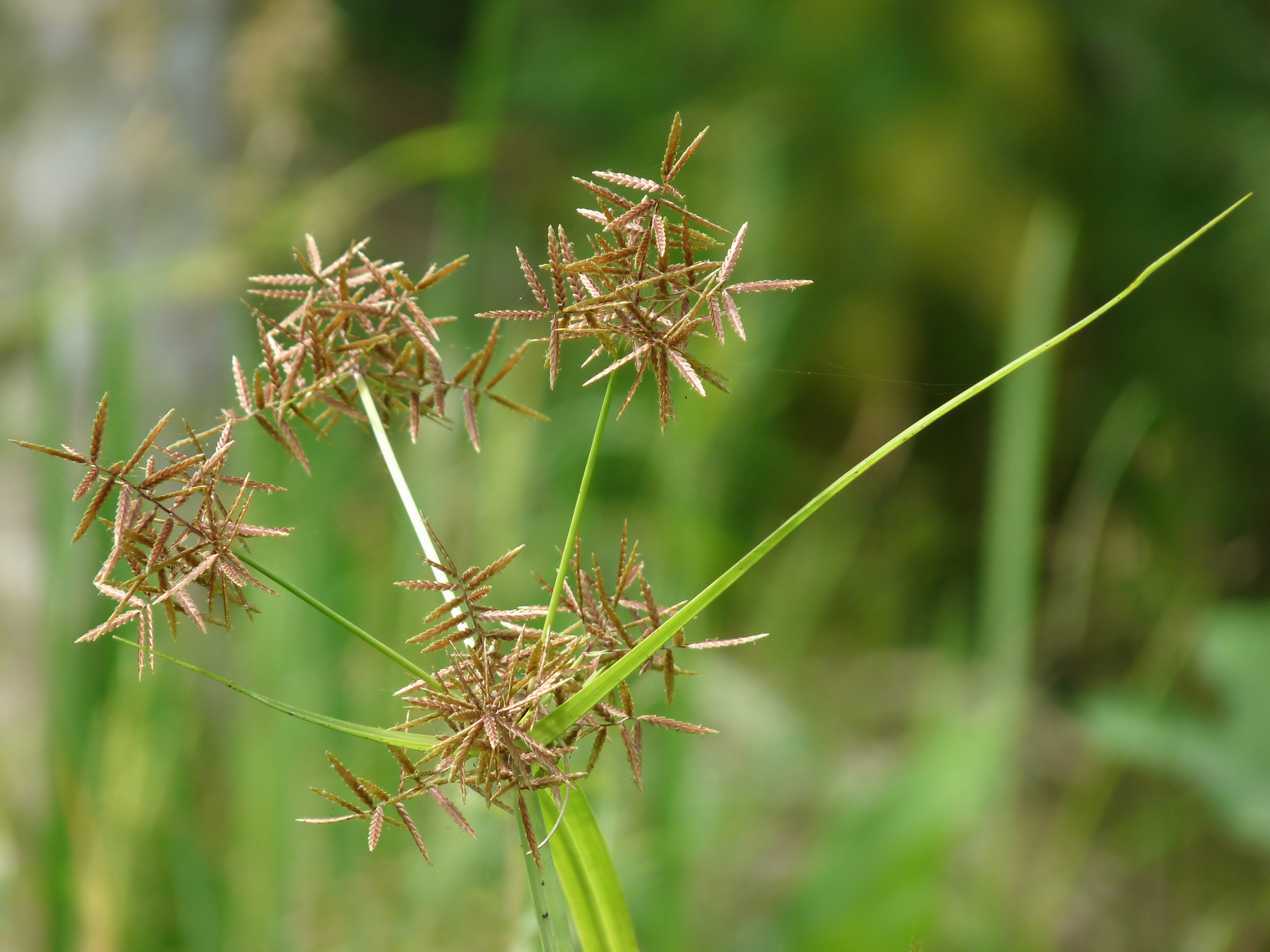
Cyperus rotundus

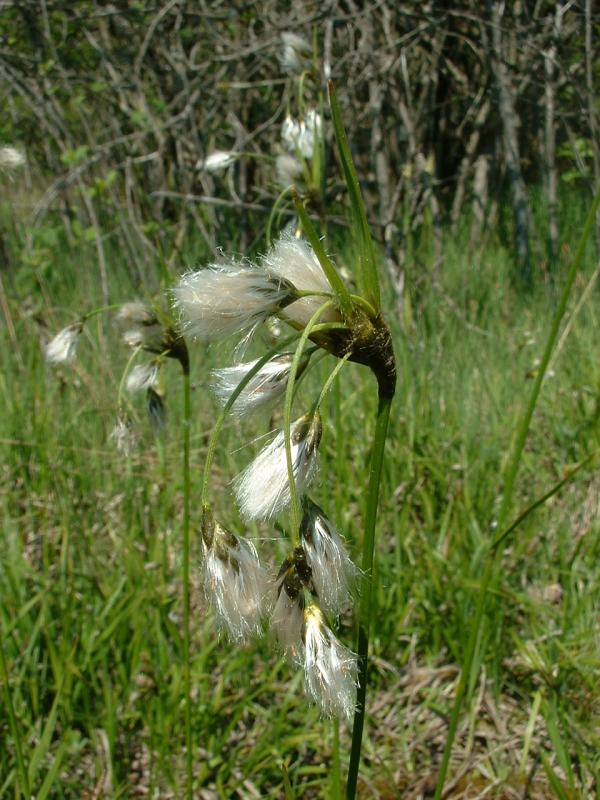
Eriophorum latifolium
