= Exochogyne =

Scientific classification
- Kingdom: Plantae
- Clade: Tracheophytes
- Clade: Angiosperms
- Clade: Monocots
- Clade: Commelinids
- Order: Poales
- Family: Cyperaceae
- Tribe: Cryptangieae
- Genus: Exochogyne; C.B.Clarke

Species
- Exochogyne amazonica C.B.Clarke; Exochogyne steyermarkii Gilly

Genus of flowering plants

Exochogyne is a genus of flowering plants in the family Cyperaceae. It includes two species of sedges native to tropical South America, ranging from Colombia, Venezuela, and the Guianas to central Brazil.

- Exochogyne amazonica C.B.Clarke
- Exochogyne steyermarkii Gilly
