= Lagenocarpus =

Scientific classification
- Kingdom: Plantae
- Clade: Tracheophytes
- Clade: Angiosperms
- Clade: Monocots
- Clade: Commelinids
- Order: Poales
- Family: Cyperaceae
- Genus: Lagenocarpus; Nees

Genus of plants

Lagenocarpus is a genus of flowering plants belonging to the family Cyperaceae.

Its native range is Tropical America.

Species:

- Lagenocarpus adamantinus Nees
- Lagenocarpus alboniger (A.St.-Hil.) C.B.Clarke
- Lagenocarpus bracteosus C.B.Clarke
- Lagenocarpus celiae T.Koyama & Maguire
- Lagenocarpus clarkei H.Pfeiff.
- Lagenocarpus comatus (Boeckeler) H.Pfeiff.
- Lagenocarpus compactus D.A.Simpson
- Lagenocarpus cubensis Kük.
- Lagenocarpus distichophyllus (Boeckeler) H.Pfeiff.
- Lagenocarpus eriopodus T.Koyama & Maguire
- Lagenocarpus glomerulatus Gilly
- Lagenocarpus griseus (Boeckeler) H.Pfeiff.
- Lagenocarpus guianensis Nees
- Lagenocarpus humilis (Nees) Kuntze
- Lagenocarpus junciformis (Kunth) Kuntze
- Lagenocarpus lanatus (T.Koyama & Maguire) T.Koyama
- Lagenocarpus minarum (Nees) Kuntze
- Lagenocarpus parvulus (C.B.Clarke) H.Pfeiff.
- Lagenocarpus pendulus T.Koyama
- Lagenocarpus polyphyllus (Nees) Kuntze
- Lagenocarpus rigidus (Kunth) Nees
- Lagenocarpus sabanensis Gilly
- Lagenocarpus sericeus H.Pfeiff.
- Lagenocarpus subaphyllus T.Koyama
- Lagenocarpus triqueter (Boeckeler) Kuntze
- Lagenocarpus velutinus Nees
- Lagenocarpus venezuelensis Davidse
- Lagenocarpus verticillatus (Spreng.) T.Koyama & Maguire
