= Erioscirpus =

Scientific classification
- Kingdom: Plantae
- Clade: Embryophytes
- Clade: Tracheophytes
- Clade: Spermatophytes
- Clade: Angiosperms
- Clade: Monocots
- Clade: Commelinids
- Order: Poales
- Family: Cyperaceae
- Genus: Erioscirpus; Palla

Genus of plants

Erioscirpus is a genus of flowering plants belonging to the family Cyperaceae.

Its native range is Iran to China.

Species:

- Erioscirpus comosus (Wall.) Palla
- Erioscirpus microstachyus (Boeckeler) Palla
