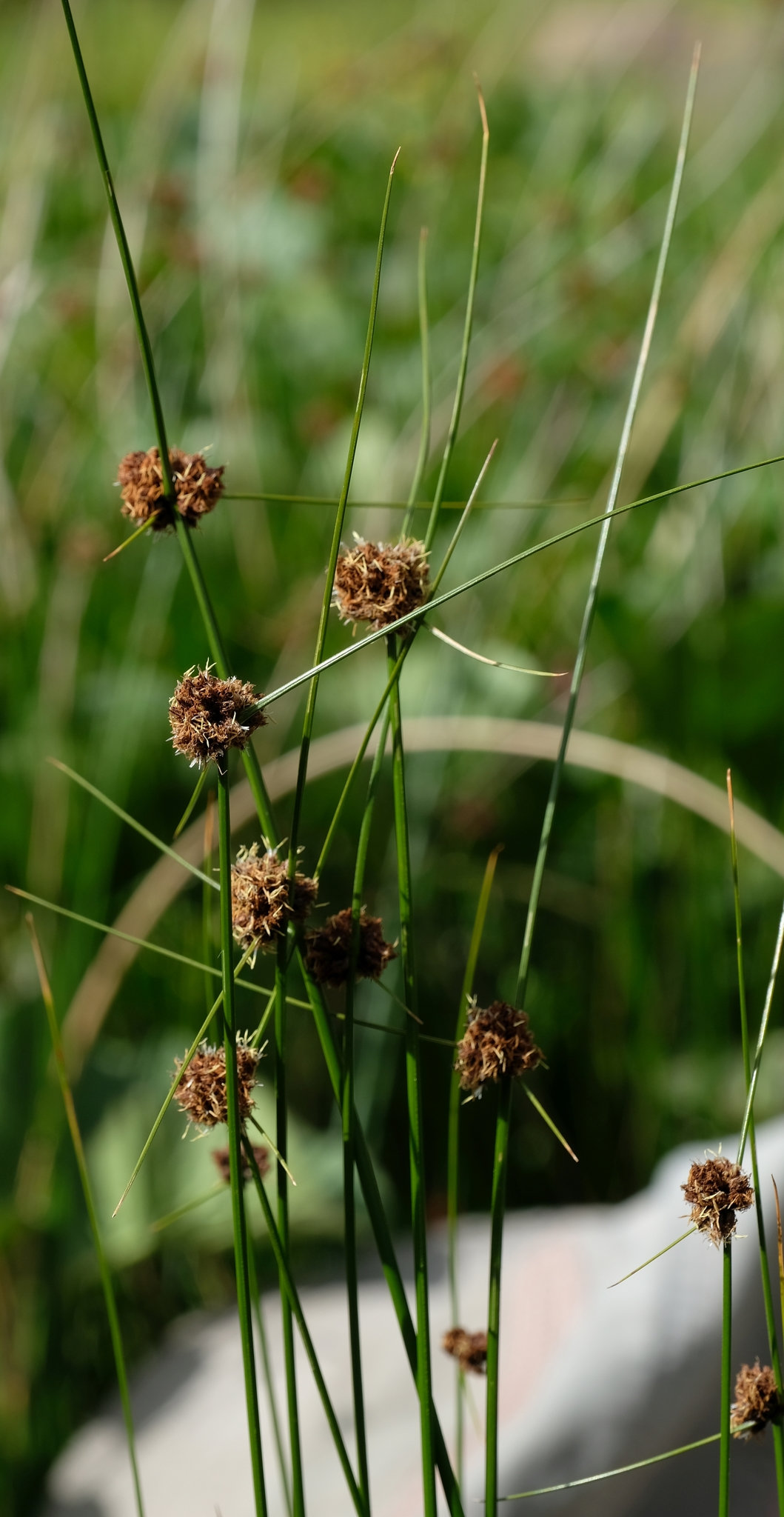
- Dracoscirpoides ficinioides

Scientific classification
- Kingdom: Plantae
- Clade: Tracheophytes
- Clade: Angiosperms
- Clade: Monocots
- Clade: Commelinids
- Order: Poales
- Family: Cyperaceae
- Genus: Dracoscirpoides; Muasya

= Dracoscirpoides =

Genus of plants

Dracoscirpoides is a genus of flowering plants belonging to the family Cyperaceae.

Its native range is Southern Africa.

Species:

- Dracoscirpoides falsa (C.B.Clarke) Muasya
- Dracoscirpoides ficinioides (Kunth) Muasya
- Dracoscirpoides surculosa Muasya, Reynders & Goetgh.
