= Cryptangium =

Scientific classification
- Kingdom: Plantae
- Clade: Tracheophytes
- Clade: Angiosperms
- Clade: Monocots
- Clade: Commelinids
- Order: Poales
- Family: Cyperaceae
- Subfamily: Cyperoideae
- Tribe: Cryptangieae
- Genus: Cryptangium; Schrad. ex Nees
- Species: C. verticillatum

Binomial name
- Cryptangium verticillatum (Spreng.) Vitta

Synonyms
- Synonymy: Cladotheca vaginans Steud.; Cryptangium ciliatum Boeckeler; Cryptangium leptocladium (Poepp. ex Kunth) Boeckeler; Cryptangium leptocladium var. longifolium Boeckeler; Cryptangium strictum (Kunth) H.Pfeiff.; Cryptangium uliginosum Schrad. ex Nees; Cryptangium uliginosum f. humilis C.B.Clarke; Fuirena verticillata Spreng. (1818) (basionym); Fuirena weigeltii A.Spreng.; Lagenocarpus ciliatus (Boeckeler) H.Pfeiff.; Lagenocarpus kunthii (Miq.) Uittien; Lagenocarpus leptocladius (Poepp. ex Kunth) Kuntze; Lagenocarpus strictus (Kunth) Kuntze; Lagenocarpus strictus var. leptocladius (Poepp. ex Kunth) H.Pfeiff.; Lagenocarpus weigeltii (A.Spreng.) Uittien; Lagenocarpus uliginosus Kuntze; Lagenocarpus verticillatus (Spreng.) T.Koyama & Maguire; Scleria hostmanniana Steud.; Scleria kunthii Miq.; Scleria leptocladia Poepp. ex Kunth; Scleria stricta Kunth

Genus of flowering plants

Cryptangium is a genus of sedges in family Cyperaceae. It includes a single species, Cryptangium verticillatum, a perennial or rhizomatous geophyte native to tropical South America. It ranges from Colombia and Venezuela to Guyana, Suriname, Bolivia, and northern, eastern and west-central Brazil.
