= List of Scleria species =

As of June 2014 The Plant List recognises about 266 accepted taxa (of species and infraspecific names) in the plant genus Scleria.

As of December 2023, Plants of the World Online recognises 255 accepted species in this genus.

== Species ==
This list is compiled from The Plant List, Germplasm Resources Information Network, Integrated Taxonomic Information System and Flora of China.

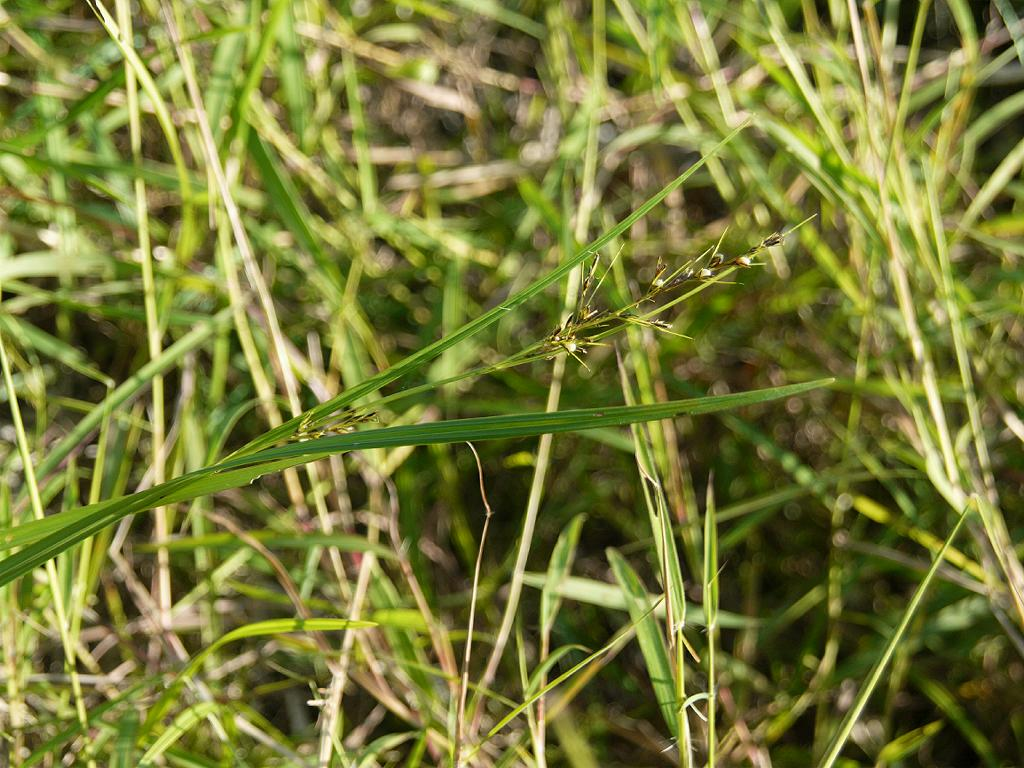
Scleria levis

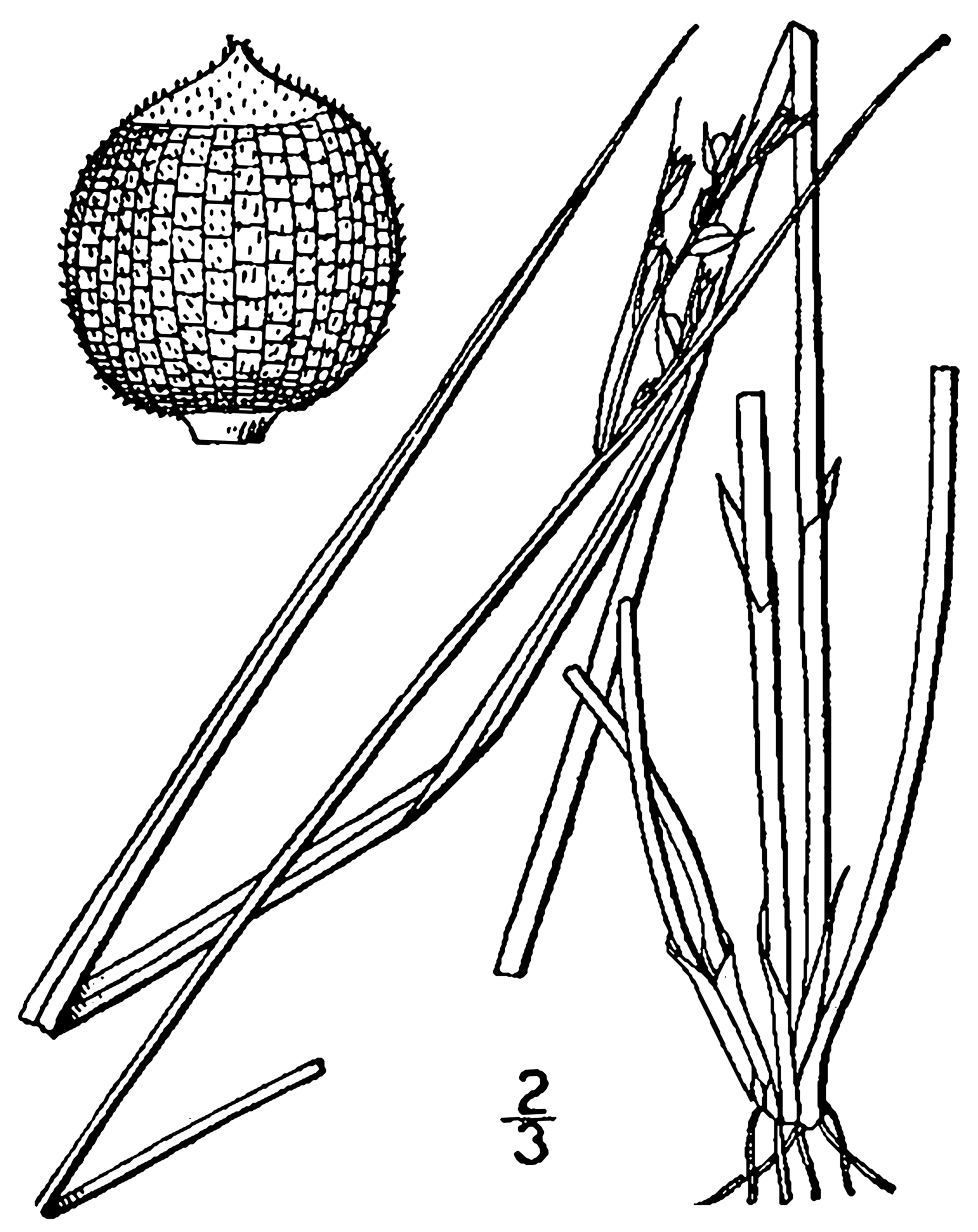
Muehlenberg's nutrush – Scleria muehlenbergii

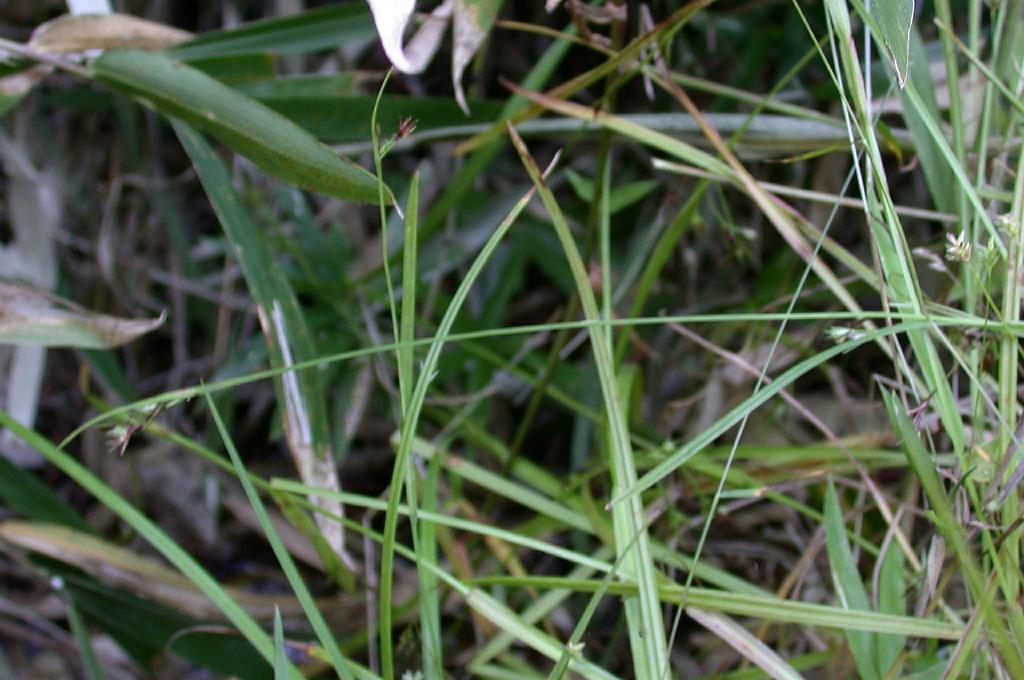
Scleria parvula

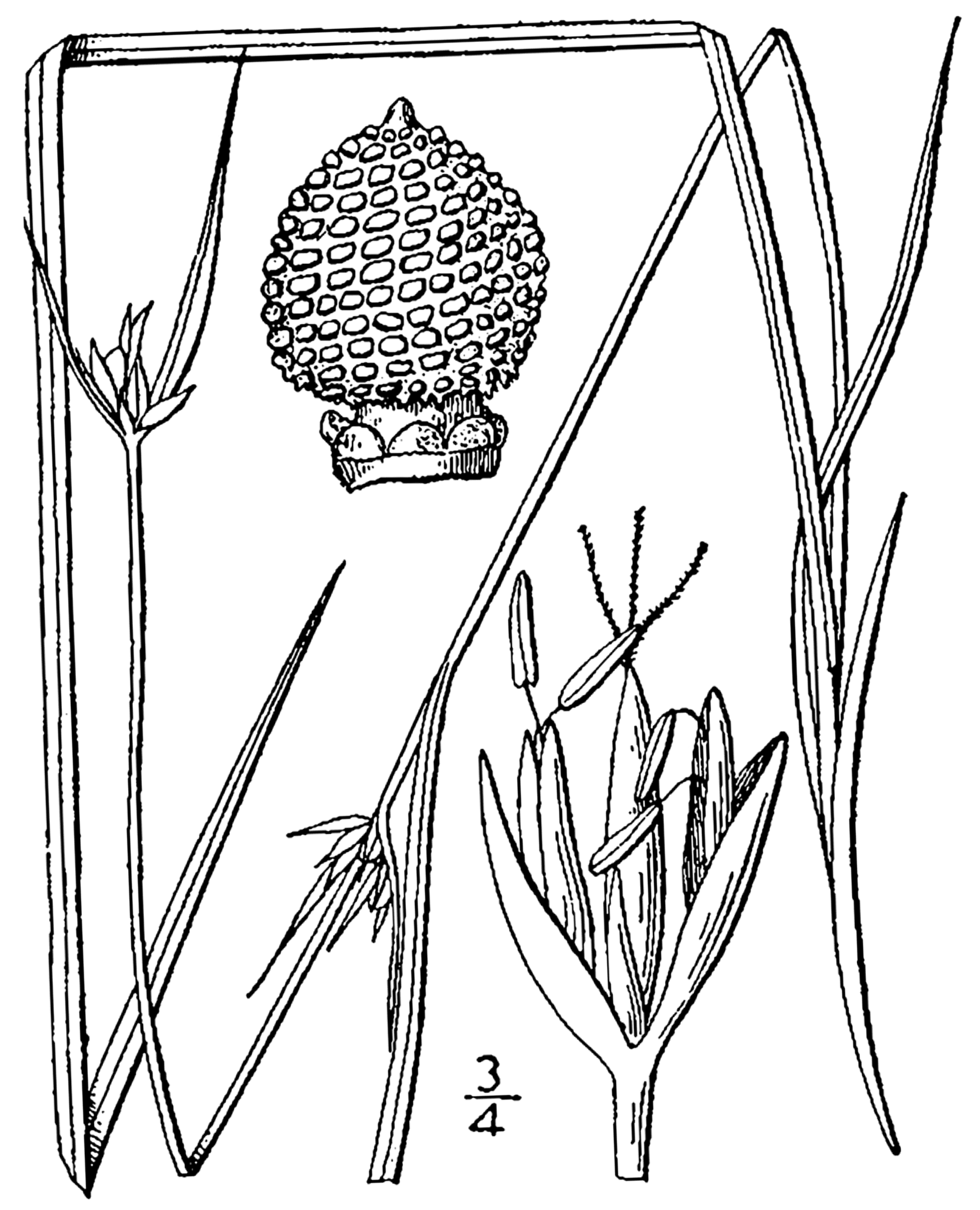
fewflower nutrush – Scleria pauciflora

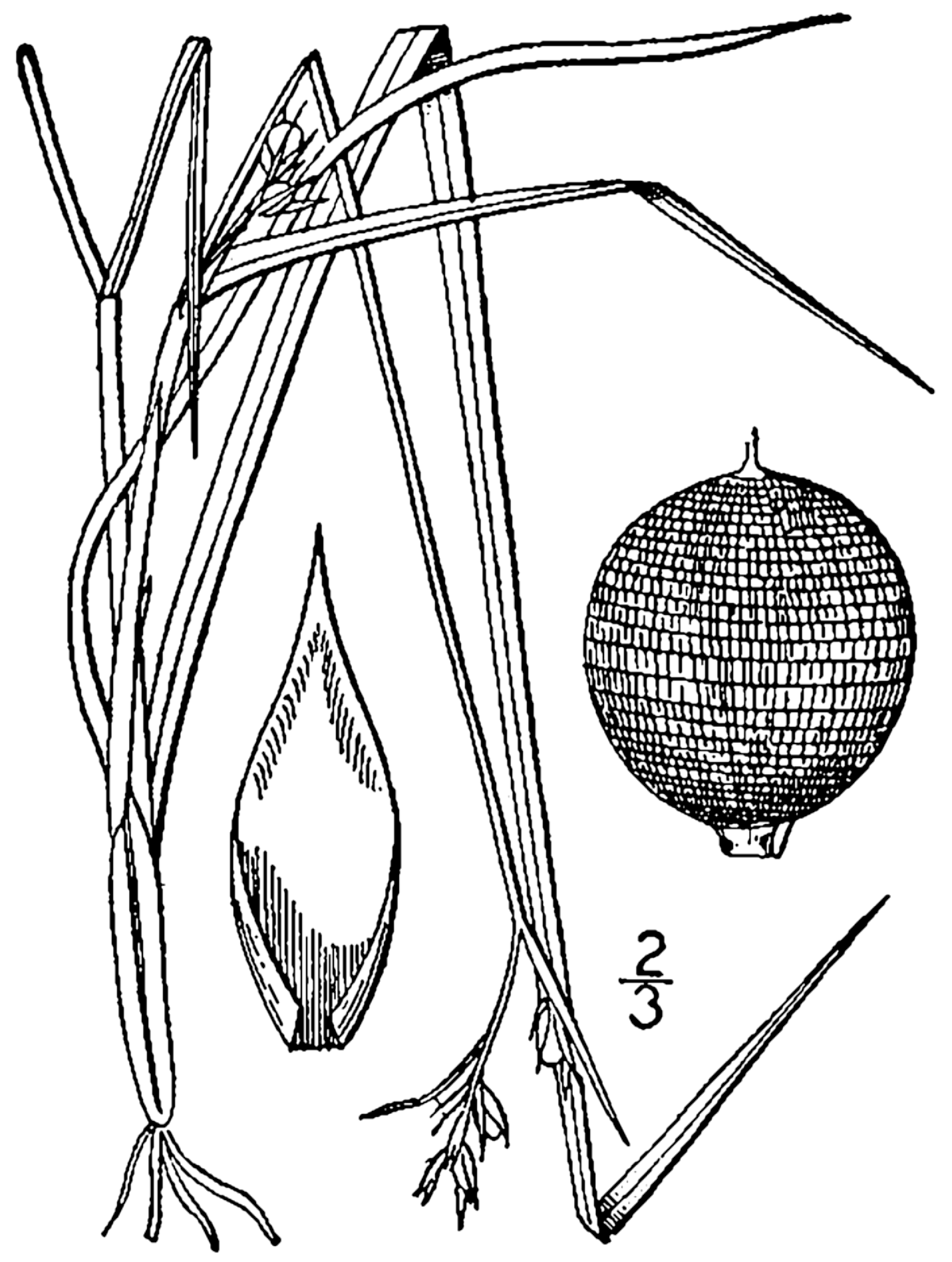
netted nutrush – Scleria reticularis

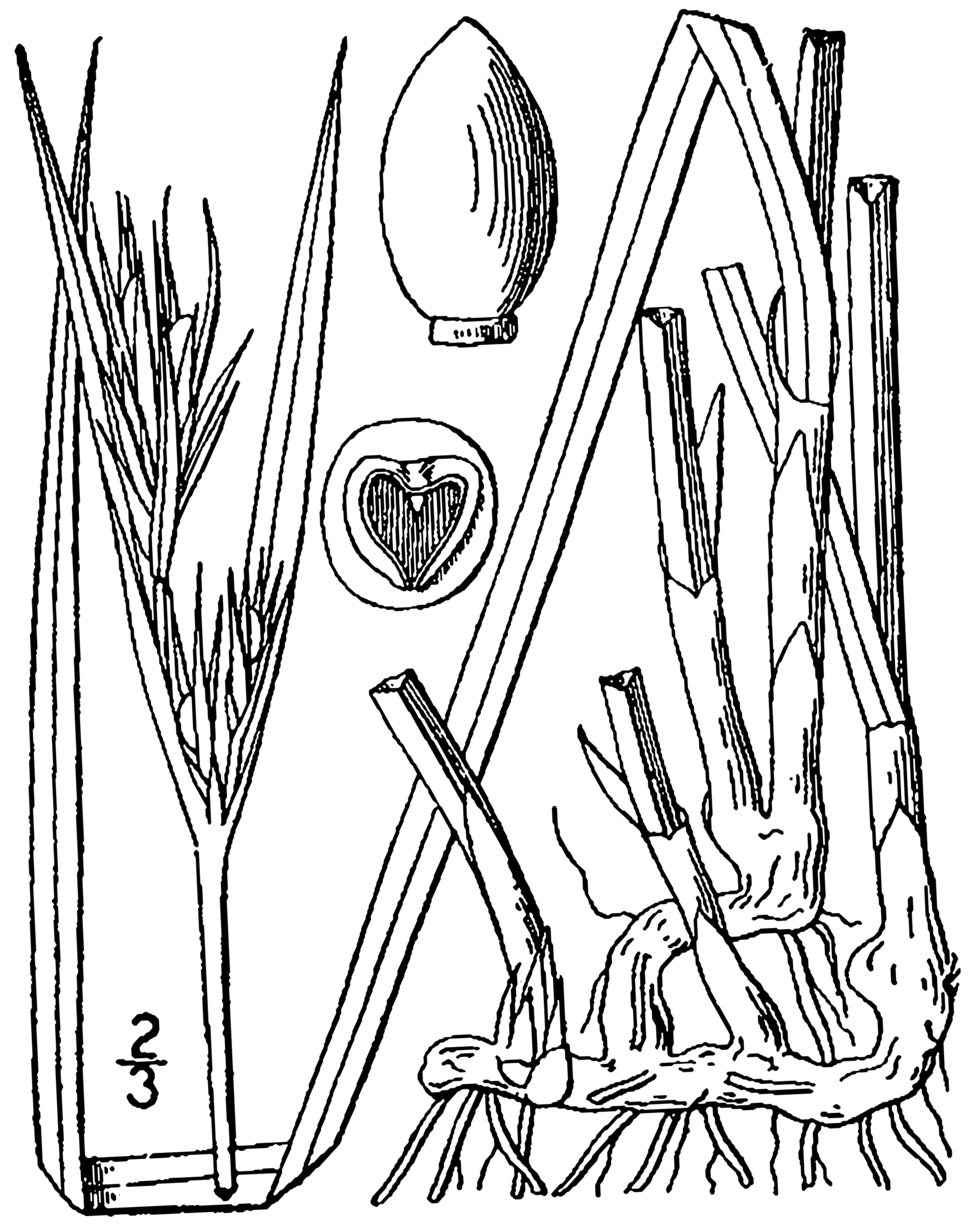
whip nutrush – Scleria triglomerata

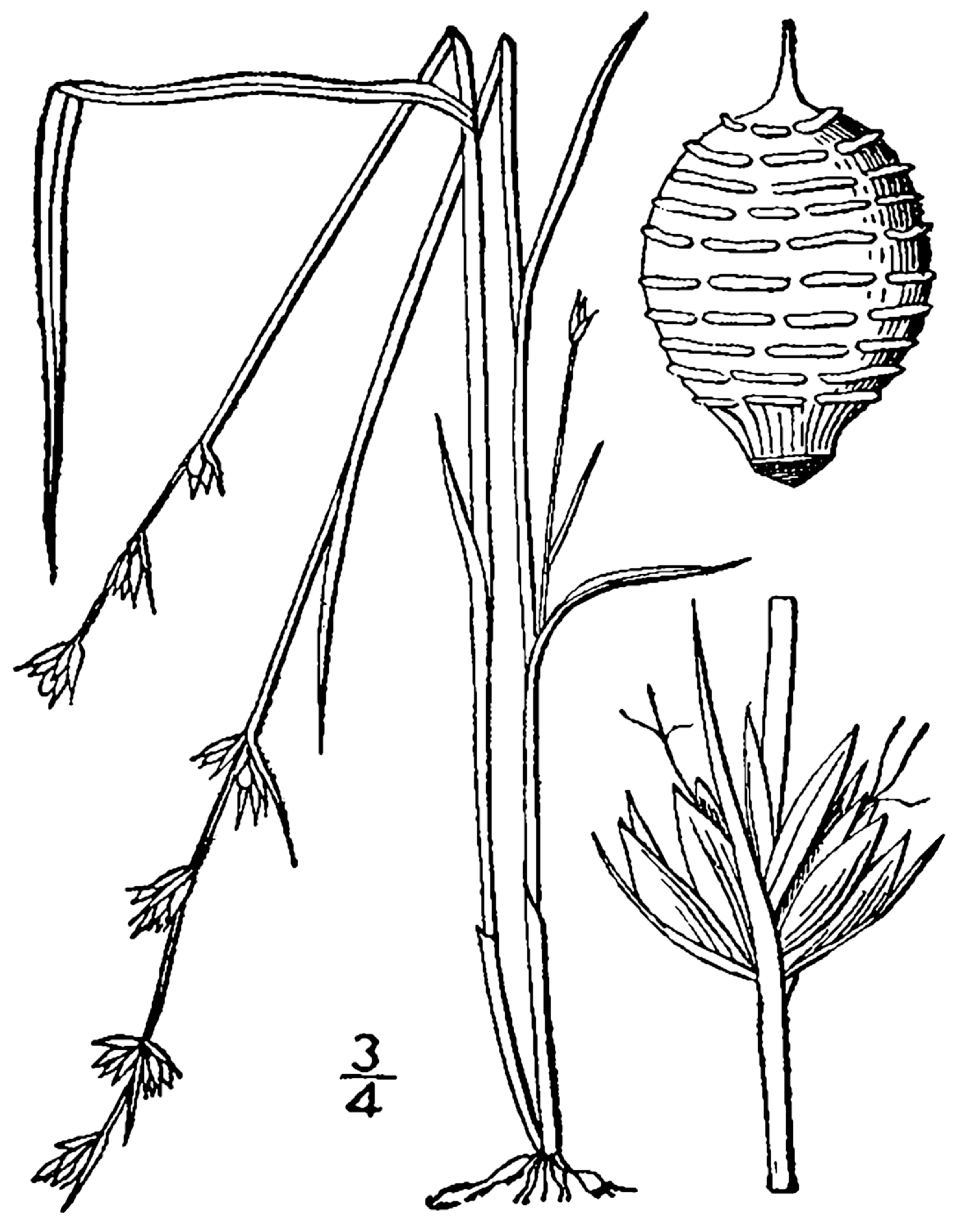
low nutrush – Scleria verticillata

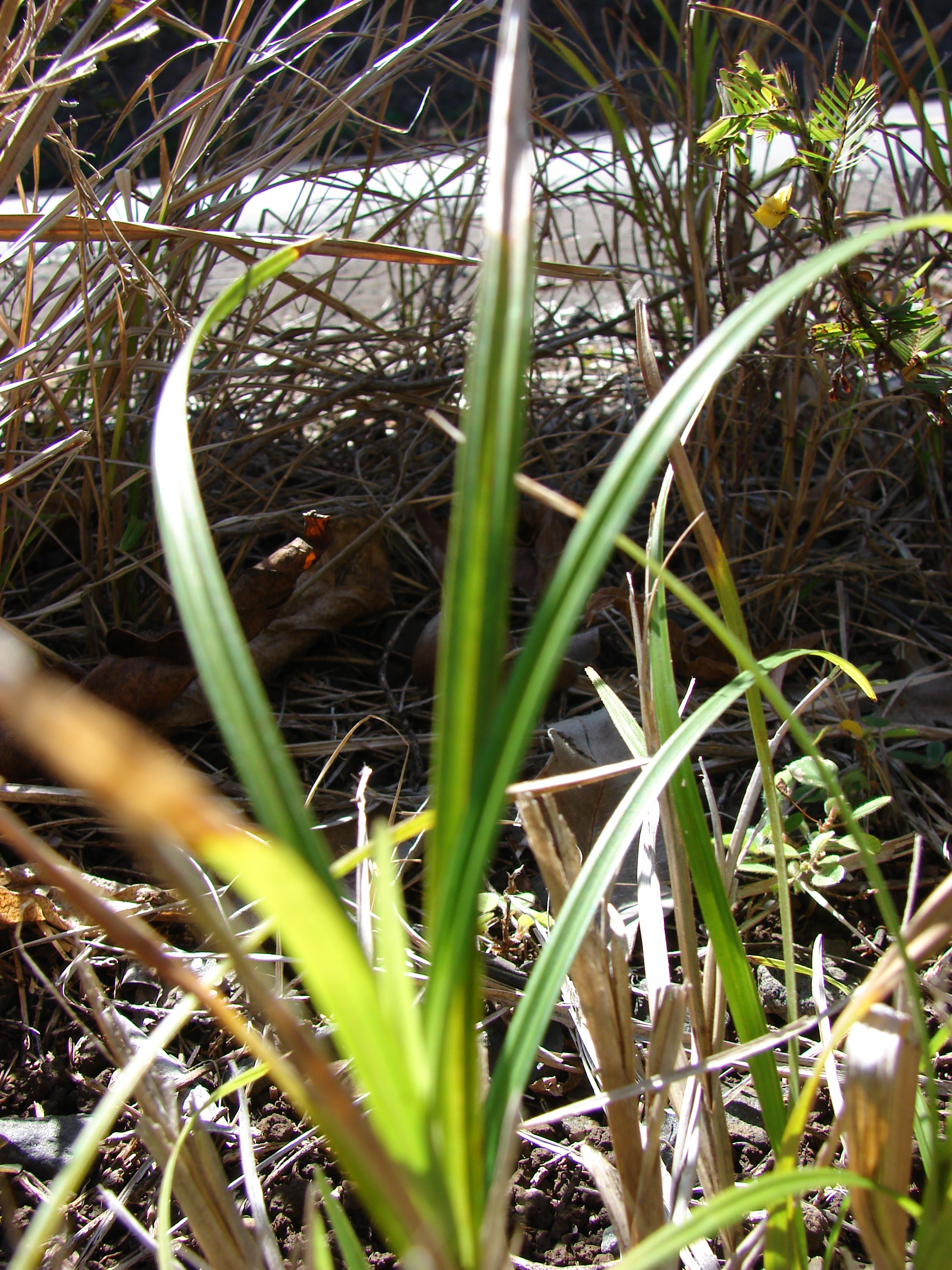
Hawai'i nutrush – Scleria testacea

- Scleria abortiva Nees ex Kunth
- Scleria acanthocarpa Boeckeler
- Scleria achtenii De Wild.
- Scleria adpressohirta (Kük.) E.A.Rob.
- Scleria afroreflexa Lye
- Scleria alpina Core
- Scleria amazonica Camelb., M.T.Strong & Goetgh.
- Scleria anceps Liebm.
- Scleria andringitrensis Cherm.
- Scleria angusta Nees ex Kunth
- Scleria angustifolia E.A.Rob.
- Scleria annularis Steud.
- Scleria anomala (Steud.) J.Raynal
- Scleria arcuata E.A.Rob.
- Scleria arguta (Nees) Steud.
- Scleria aromatica Core
- Scleria assamica (C.B.Clarke) D.M.Verma
- Scleria atroglumis D.A.Simpson
- Scleria balansae Maury ex Micheli
- Scleria baldwinii (Torr.) Steud. – Baldwin's nutrush
- Scleria bambariensis Cherm.
- Scleria bancana Miq. – winged scleria
- Scleria baroni-clarkei De Wild.
- Scleria baronii C.B.Clarke ex Cherm.
- Scleria barteri Boeckeler
- Scleria benthamii C.B.Clarke
- Scleria bequaertii De Wild.
- Scleria bicolor Nelmes
- Scleria biflora Roxb.
- Scleria boivinii Steud.
- Scleria boniana Boeckeler
- Scleria borii D.M.Verma
- Scleria bourgeaui Boeckeler – Bourgeau's nutrush
- Scleria bracteata Cav. – bracted nutrush
- Scleria bradei Gross
- Scleria brownii Kunth
- Scleria buekiana Schltdl.
- Scleria buettneri Boeckeler
- Scleria bulbifera Hochst. ex A.Rich.
- Scleria burchellii C.B.Clarke
- Scleria calcicola E.A.Rob.
- Scleria camaratensis Core
- Scleria canescens Boeckeler
- Scleria carphiformis Ridl.
- Scleria castanea Core
- Scleria catharinensis Boeckeler
- Scleria catophylla C.B.Clarke
- Scleria chevalieri J.Raynal
- Scleria chlorocalyx E.A.Rob.
- Scleria ciliaris Nees
- Scleria ciliata Michx. – fringed nutrush
  - var. elliottii (Chapm.) Fernald
  - var. glabra (Chapm.) Fairey
- Scleria clarkei Lindm.
- Scleria clathrata Hochst. ex A.Rich.
- Scleria cochinchinensis (Lour.) Druce
- Scleria colorata Core
- Scleria comosa (Nees) Steud.
- Scleria complanata Boeckeler
- Scleria composita (Nees) Boeckeler
- Scleria corymbosa Roxb.
- Scleria cubensis Boeckeler – Cuban nutrush
- Scleria curtissii Britton – Curtiss' nutrush
- Scleria cuyabensis Pilg.
- Scleria cyathophora Holttum
- Scleria cyperina Kunth
- Scleria delicatula Nelmes
- Scleria densispicata (C.B.Clarke) J.Kern
- Scleria depauperata Boeckeler
- Scleria depressa (C.B.Clarke) Nelmes
- Scleria distans Poir. – riverswamp nutrush
  - var. chondrocarpa (Nelmes) Lye
  - var. glomerulata (Oliv.) Lye
- Scleria dregeana Kunth
- Scleria dulungensis P.C.Li
- Scleria eggersiana Boeckeler – Eggers' nutrush
- Scleria elongatissima Piérart
- Scleria erythrorrhiza Ridl.
- Scleria fauriei Ohwi
- Scleria filiculmis Boeckeler
- Scleria flagellum-nigrorum P.J.Bergius
- Scleria flexuosa Boeckeler
- Scleria foliosa Hochst. ex A.Rich.
- Scleria foveolata Cav.
- Scleria fulvipilosa E.A.Rob.
- Scleria gaertneri Raddi
- Scleria georgiana Core – slenderfruit nutrush
- Scleria glabra Boeckeler
- Scleria globonux C.B.Clarke
- Scleria goosenii De Wild.
- Scleria goossensii De Wild.
- Scleria gracillima Boeckeler
- Scleria greigiifolia (Ridl.) C.B.Clarke
- Scleria guineensis J.Raynal
- Scleria harlandii Hance
- Scleria havanensis Britton – Havana nutrush
- Scleria hildebrandtii Boeckeler
- Scleria hilsenbergii Ridl.
- Scleria hirta Boeckeler
- Scleria hirtella Sw. – riverswamp nutrush
- Scleria hispidior (C.B.Clarke) Nelmes
- Scleria hispidula Hochst. ex A.Rich.
- Scleria hookeriana Boeckeler
- Scleria huberi C.B.Clarke
- Scleria induta Turrill
- Scleria interrupta Rich.
- Scleria iostephana Nelmes
- Scleria jiangchengensis Y.Y.Qian
- Scleria junghuhniana Boeckeler
- Scleria kerrii Turrill
- Scleria khasiana Boeckeler
- Scleria killipiana Britton
- Scleria kindtiana Graebn.
- Scleria lacustris C.Wright – lakeshore nutrush
- Scleria laevis Willd. – smooth scleria
- Scleria lagoensis Boeckeler
- Scleria latifolia Sw.
- Scleria laxa R.Br.
- Scleria laxiflora Gross
- Scleria leptostachya Kunth
- Scleria levis Retz.
- Scleria lingulata C.B.Clarke
- Scleria lithosperma (L.) Sw. – Florida Keys nutrush
  - var. linearis Benth.
  - subsp. linearis (Benth.) T.Koyama
  - subsp. lithosperma
- Scleria longispiculata Nelmes
- Scleria lucentinigricans E.A.Rob.
- Scleria macbrideana Gross
- Scleria mackaviensis Boeckeler
- Scleria macrogyne C.B.Clarke
- Scleria macrolomioides H.Pfeiff.
- Scleria macrophylla J.Presl & C.Presl
- Scleria madagascariensis Boeckeler
- Scleria martii (Nees) Steud.
- Scleria melaleuca Rchb. ex Schltdl. & Cham.
- Scleria melanomphala Kunth
- Scleria melanotricha Hochst. & A.Rich.
- Scleria melicoides Schltdl.
- Scleria microcarpa Nees ex Kunth – tropical nutrush
- Scleria mikawana Makino
- Scleria millespicula T.Koyama
- Scleria minima C.B.Clarke
- Scleria minor (Britton) W.Stone – slender nutrush
- Scleria mitis P.J.Bergius – cortadora
- Scleria monticola Nelmes ex Napper
- Scleria motemboensis Britton
- Scleria motleyi C.B.Clarke
  - subsp. rostrata J.Kern
- Scleria mucronata Poir.
- Scleria muehlenbergii Steud. – Muehlenberg's nutrush
- Scleria multilacunosa T.Koyama
- Scleria mutoensis Nakai
- Scleria myricocarpa Kunth
- Scleria natalensis Boeckeler ex C.B.Clarke
- Scleria naumanniana Boeckeler
- Scleria neesii Kunth
- Scleria neocaledonica Rendle
- Scleria neogranatensis C.B.Clarke
- Scleria novae-hollandiae Boeckeler
- Scleria nyasensis C.B.Clarke
- Scleria oblata S.T.Blake ex J.Kern
- Scleria obtusa Core
- Scleria oligantha Michx. – littlehead nutrush
- Scleria oligochondra Nelmes
- Scleria orchardii C.D.Adams
- Scleria ovinux J.Raynal ex Fosberg
- Scleria pachyrrhyncha Nelmes
- Scleria panicoides Kunth
- Scleria papuana J.Kern
- Scleria parallella C.B.Clarke
- Scleria parvula Steud.
- Scleria patula E.A.Rob.
- Scleria pauciflora Muhl. ex Willd. – fewflower nutrush
  - var. caroliniana (Willd.) Alph.Wood
  - var. curtissii (Britton) Fairey
- Scleria paupercula E.A.Rob.
- Scleria pergracilis (Nees) Kunth
- Scleria pernambucana Luceño & M.Alves
- Scleria perpusilla Cherm.
- Scleria pilosa Boeckeler
- Scleria pilosissima Britton
- Scleria plusiophylla Steud.
- Scleria poeppigii (Nees) Steud.
- Scleria poiformis Retz.
- Scleria poklei Wad.Khan
- Scleria polycarpa Boeckeler
- Scleria polyrrhiza E.A.Rob.
- Scleria pooides Ridl.
- Scleria porphyrocarpa E.A.Rob.
- Scleria procumbens E.A.Rob.
- Scleria psilorrhiza C.B.Clarke
- Scleria pulchella Ridl.
- Scleria purdiei C.B.Clarke – Purdie's nutrush
- Scleria purpurascens Steud.
  - var. ophirensis (C.B.Clarke) J.Kern
- Scleria pusilla Pilg.
- Scleria racemosa Poir.
- Scleria radula Hance
- Scleria ramosa C.B.Clarke
- Scleria rehmannii C.B.Clarke
- Scleria reticularis Michx. – reticulated nutrush, netted nutrush
- Scleria richardsiae E.A.Rob.
- Scleria robinsoniana J.Raynal
- Scleria robusta Camelb. & Goetgh.
- Scleria rugosa R.Br.
- Scleria rutenbergiana Boeckeler
- Scleria scabra Willd.
- Scleria scabriuscula Schltdl. – mosquito nutrush
- Scleria scandens Core
- Scleria schenckiana Boeckeler
- Scleria schiedeana Schltdl.
- Scleria schimperiana Boeckeler
- Scleria schulzii Barros
- Scleria scindens Nees ex Kunth – hairy nutrush
- Scleria scrobiculata Nees & Meyen
- Scleria secans (L.) Urb. – razor grass
- Scleria sellowiana Kunth
- Scleria setulosociliata Boeckeler
- Scleria sheilae J.Raynal
- Scleria sieberi Nees
- Scleria skutchii M.T.Strong & J.R.Grant
- Scleria sobolifer E.F.Franklin
- Scleria sororia Kunth
- Scleria sphacelata F.Muell.
- Scleria sphaerocarpa (E.A.Rob.) Napper
- Scleria spicata (Spreng.) J.F.Macbr.
- Scleria spiciformis Benth.
- Scleria splitgerberiana Henrard ex Uittien
- Scleria sprucei C.B.Clarke
- Scleria staheliana Uittien
- Scleria stenophylla Core
- Scleria stereorrhiza C.Wright ex C.B.Clarke
- Scleria stipitata Uittien
- Scleria stipularis Nees
- Scleria stocksiana Boeckeler
- Scleria sumatrensis Retz. – Sumatran scleria
- Scleria swamyi Govind.
- Scleria sylvestris Poepp. & Kunth
- Scleria tenacissima (Nees) Steud.
- Scleria tenella Kunth – fly nutrush
- Scleria tepuiensis Core
- Scleria terrestris (L.) Fassett
  - var. hookeriana (Boeckeler) D.M.Verma
  - var. thomsoniana (Boeckeler) D.M.Verma
- Scleria tessellata Willd.
  - var. sphaerocarpa E.A.Rob.
- Scleria testacea Nees ex Kunth – Hawai'i nutrush
- Scleria thwaitesiana Boeckeler
- Scleria tonkinensis C.B.Clarke
- Scleria transvaalensis E.F.Franklin
- Scleria trialata Poir.
- Scleria tricuspidata S.T.Blake
- Scleria triglomerata Michx. – whip nutrush
- Scleria triquetra M.T.Strong
- Scleria tropicalis M.T.Strong
- Scleria tryonii Domin
- Scleria uleana Boeckeler
- Scleria unguiculata E.A.Rob.
- Scleria vaginata Steud.
- Scleria valdemuricata Kük.
- Scleria variegata (Nees) Steud.
- Scleria venezuelensis Core
- Scleria verrucosa Willd.
- Scleria verticillata Muhl. ex Willd. – low nutrush
- Scleria veseyfitzgeraldii E.A.Rob.
- Scleria vichadensis F.J.Herm.
- Scleria violacea Pilg.
- Scleria virgata (Nees) Steud.
- Scleria vogelii C.B.Clarke
- Scleria warmingiana Boeckeler
- Scleria welwitschii C.B.Clarke
- Scleria williamsii Gross
- Scleria woodii C.B.Clarke
  - var. ornata (Cherm.) J.Schultze-Motel
- Scleria wrightiana Boeckeler
- Scleria xerophila E.A.Rob.
- Scleria zambesica E.A.Rob.
