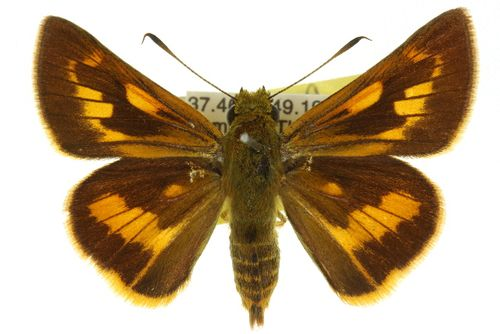

Scientific classification
- Kingdom: Animalia
- Phylum: Arthropoda
- Class: Insecta
- Order: Lepidoptera
- Family: Hesperiidae
- Genus: Telicota
- Species: T. eurotas

Binomial name
- Telicota eurotas (Felder, 1860)

Synonyms
- Pamphila eurotas Felder, 1860

= Telicota eurotas =

Species of butterfly

Telicota eurotas, the sedge darter, is a butterfly of the family Hesperiidae. It is found in Australia (the north-eastern coast of Queensland), the Aru Islands, Irian Jaya, Maluku and Papua New Guinea.

The wingspan is about 30 mm.

The larvae feed on various sedges, including Carex polyantha, Cladium procerum, Scleria ciliaris, Scleria polycarpa and Scleria sumatrensis. It lives in a shelter made from leaves of the hostplant joined with silk.

== Subspecies ==
- Telicota eurotas eurotas (Ambon, Maluku, Indonesia, Papua New Guinea)
- Telicota eurotas laconia Waterhouse, 1937 (north-eastern coast of Queensland)
