= Z. terrestris =

Z. terrestris may refer to:

- Zizania terrestris, a wild rice species
- Zoothera terrestris, an extinct bird species

== See also ==
- Terrestris
