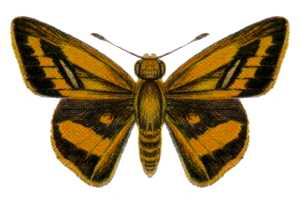

Scientific classification
- Kingdom: Animalia
- Phylum: Arthropoda
- Class: Insecta
- Order: Lepidoptera
- Family: Hesperiidae
- Genus: Telicota
- Species: T. mesoptis

Binomial name
- Telicota mesoptis (Lower, 1911)

= Telicota mesoptis =

Species of butterfly

Telicota mesoptis, also known as the narrow-brand darter, is a butterfly of the family Hesperiidae. It is found in Australia (the northern Gulf and north-eastern coast of Queensland), the Aru Islands, Irian Jaya, the Kei Islands and Papua New Guinea.

These butterflies have an average wingspan of about 30 mm.

The larvae feed on Panicum maximum and Sorghum verticilliflorum.

== Subspecies ==
- Telicota mesoptis mesoptis (Lower, 1911) – Lower's grass dart or Lower's darter (northern Gulf and north-eastern coast of Queensland, the Aru Islands, the Kei Islands)
