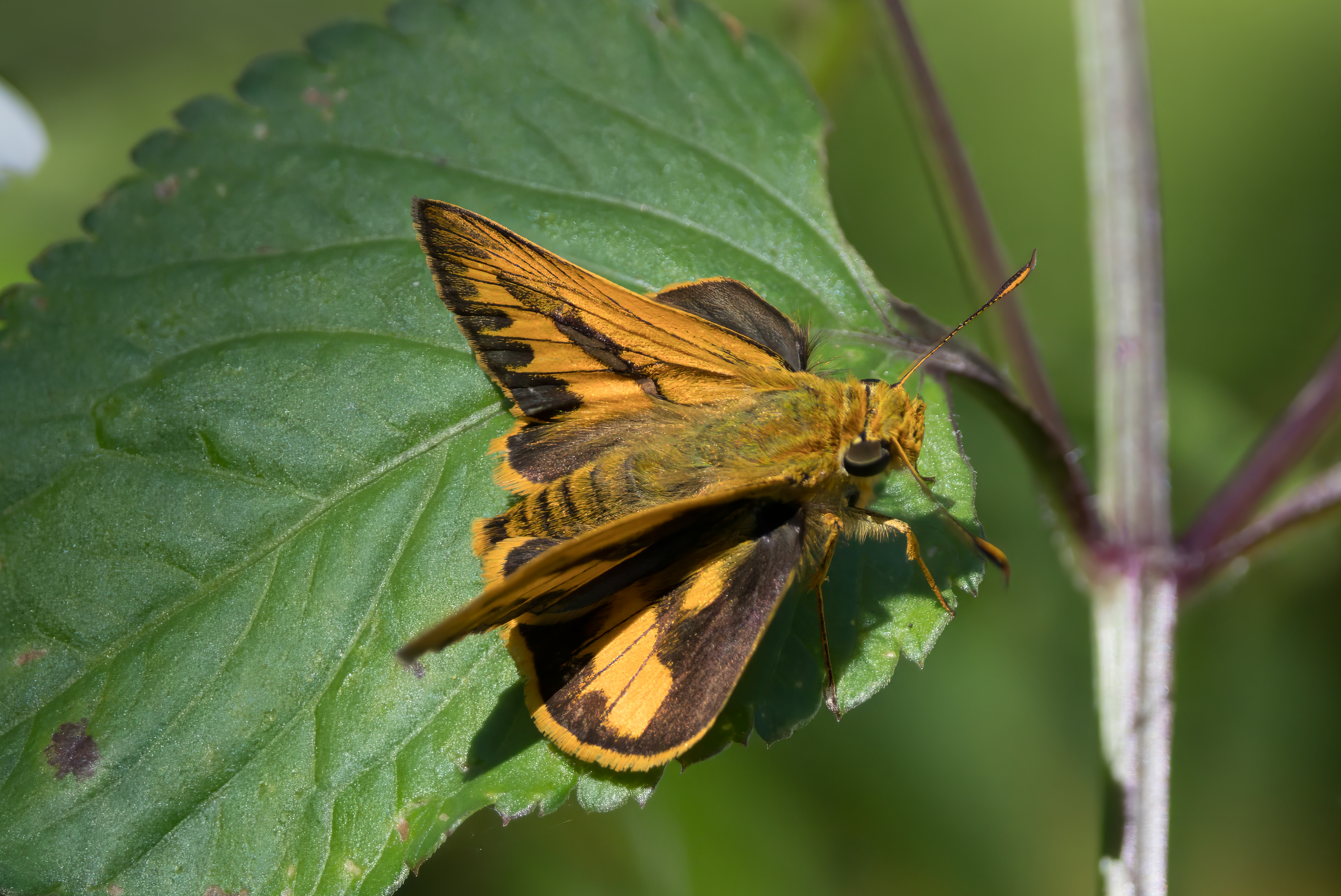
- Telicota colon bayashikeii, Taiwan

Scientific classification
- Kingdom: Animalia
- Phylum: Arthropoda
- Clade: Pancrustacea
- Class: Insecta
- Order: Lepidoptera
- Family: Hesperiidae
- Genus: Telicota
- Species: T. colon

Binomial name
- Telicota colon (Fabricius, 1775)

= Telicota colon =

Species of butterfly

Telicota colon, commonly known as the pale palm dart or common palm dart, is a species of butterfly in the family Hesperiidae. It is found from India to Australia.

== Description ==
Male. Upperside. Forewing golden-ochreous, costal and outer marginal line black, a narrow, pale blackish streak beneath the upper and lower margins of the cell, a broad, black, more or less oval-shaped band from the lower end of the cell to the middle of the sub-median vein, containing a linear discal stigma throughout its length, with some pale obscure spots in continuation upwards towards the apex of the wing; all the veins black, some blackish suffusion on the hinder marginal area below the sub-median vein, a black, macular, marginal baud consisting of elongated square spots, decreasing in size upwards, one in each interspace. Hindwing black, a golden-orange, rather large spot at the end of the cell, a large discal patch of that colour, from above vein 6 to below vein 2 where it joins a golden-yellow streak which runs through interspace 1 from its base to its end, the patch divided by the black veins 2, 3, 4 and 6, into elongated spots mostly scalloped on their outer sides and rounded on their inner sides. Cilia of both wings yellow, touched with brown on the upper part of the forewing. Underside. Forewing brownish-ochreous, the basal half of the cell, the space below it and the discal band black, the discal band with some diffused marks and spots continued up to the apex; the outer marginal band of the upper.side represented obscurely down to vein 2, from whence it is continued broadly black round the hinder angle, all the veins black. Hindwing brownish-ochreous, somewhat darker than the forewing, the discal patch indicated by black spots round its margins. Antennae black, white beneath, the shaft spotted with black, the club with a dull red tip; palpi ochreous above, white beneath, pectus white; head and body brown above, covered with ochreous hairs, abdomen whitish beneath. Female. Upperside, both wings mostly blackish-brown. Forewing with an ochreous streak along the costa, and an ochreous spot at the end of the cell, three sub-apical ochreous spots, a discal ochreous outwardly oblique band divided by the veins into elongated spots from the sub-median vein, the spots narrowing upwards, excavated on their outer sides, ending in two small spots or dots towards the apex outside the lower end of the sub-apical spots. Hindwing with a discal ochreous band and abdominal streak as in the male. Cilia of both winos whiter. Underside much as in the male; the upperside varies in different examples in the extent and breadth of the ochreous markings.

— Charles Swinhoe, Lepidoptera Indica. Vol. X

The larvae are known to feed on Bambusa vulgaris, Phragmites karka, Oryza, Saccharum and Ochlandra travancorica.

== Subspecies ==
- Telicota colon colon
- Telicota colon argeus (Plötz, 1883) – pale darter (south-eastern coast of New South Wales, the northern Gulf and northern coast of the Northern Territory, the northern Gulf and north-eastern coast of Queensland and the north-western coast of Western Australia, Irian Jaya, Maluku and Papua New Guinea)
- Telicota colon vaja Corbet, 1942 (Philippines to Sumatra and to Timor)
- Telicota colon vega Evans, 1949 (Papua New Guinea)
- Telicota colon stinga (Malacca)
- Telicota colon zara (St. Mathias)
