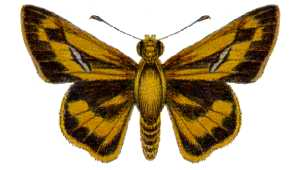

Scientific classification
- Kingdom: Animalia
- Phylum: Arthropoda
- Class: Insecta
- Order: Lepidoptera
- Family: Hesperiidae
- Genus: Telicota
- Species: T. eurychlora

Binomial name
- Telicota eurychlora Lower, 1908

= Telicota eurychlora =

Species of butterfly

Telicota eurychlora, the dingy darter, is a butterfly of the family Hesperiidae. It is found in Australia along the south-eastern coast of New South Wales and the north-eastern coast of Queensland.

The larvae feed on Cladium procerum.
