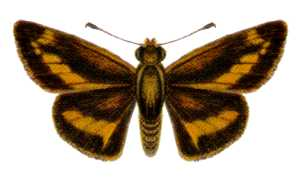

Scientific classification
- Kingdom: Animalia
- Phylum: Arthropoda
- Class: Insecta
- Order: Lepidoptera
- Family: Hesperiidae
- Genus: Telicota
- Species: T. brachydesma

Binomial name
- Telicota brachydesma Lower, 1908

= Telicota brachydesma =

Species of butterfly

Telicota brachydesma, the small darter, is a butterfly of the family Hesperiidae. It is found in Australia (the north-eastern coast of Queensland), the Aru Islands, Papua Province and Papua New Guinea.

The wingspan is about 25 mm.

The larvae feed on Leptaspis banksii.
