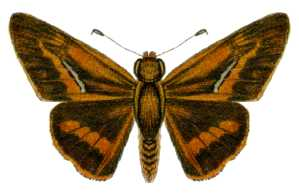

Scientific classification
- Kingdom: Animalia
- Phylum: Arthropoda
- Clade: Pancrustacea
- Class: Insecta
- Order: Lepidoptera
- Family: Hesperiidae
- Genus: Telicota
- Species: T. ohara

Binomial name
- Telicota ohara (Plötz, 1883)

Synonyms
- Hesperia ohara Plötz, 1883

= Telicota ohara =

Species of butterfly

Telicota ohara, the northern large darter, is a butterfly of the family Hesperiidae. It is found in the Oriental and Australian Regions, but not on the Pacific islands.

The wingspan is about 30 mm.

The larvae feed on Flagellaria indica.

== Subspecies ==
- Telicota ohara ohara (Plötz, 1883) – dark darter (Australia)
- Telicota ohara formosana Fruhstorfer, 1911 (Hong Kong, Taiwan)
- Telicota ohara jania Evans, 1949 pls. BMNH, London.(Marinduque, Mindanao, Mindoro, Negros, Palawan, Polillo, Samar)
- Telicota ohara jix (Sikkim, Japan)
- Telicota ohara vedanga (Java)
- Telicota ohara jactus (Borneo)
- Telicota ohara iona (Buru)
- Telicota ohara ixion (Upper Aroa River)
