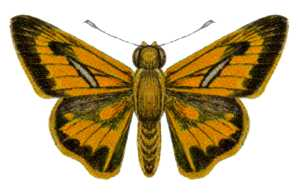

Scientific classification
- Kingdom: Animalia
- Phylum: Arthropoda
- Clade: Pancrustacea
- Class: Insecta
- Order: Lepidoptera
- Family: Hesperiidae
- Genus: Telicota
- Species: T. augias

Binomial name
- Telicota augias (Linnaeus, 1763)

Synonyms
- Papilio augias Linnaeus, 1763; Pamphila krefftii Macleay, 1866; Telicota krefftii argilus Waterhouse, 1933

= Telicota augias =

Species of butterfly

Telicota augias, the bright-orange darter, is a butterfly of the family Hesperiidae. It is found in Australia, Papua New Guinea, Myanmar, Indonesia and the Philippines.

The wingspan is about 30 mm.It is similar to Telicota bambusae differing in that the black margin of the fore wing above is crossed by the yellow veins and being thus divided into single marginal spots.

The larvae feed on Flagellaria indica.

== Subspecies ==
- Telicota augias augias (Burma to Java and Borneo)
- Telicota augias florina (southern Flores)
- Telicota augias krefftii (Macleay, 1866) – Krefft's darter (the northern Gulf and northern coast of the Northern Territory, the northern Gulf and north-eastern coast of Queensland and the northern coast of Western Australia)
- Telicota augias pythias (Philippines)
