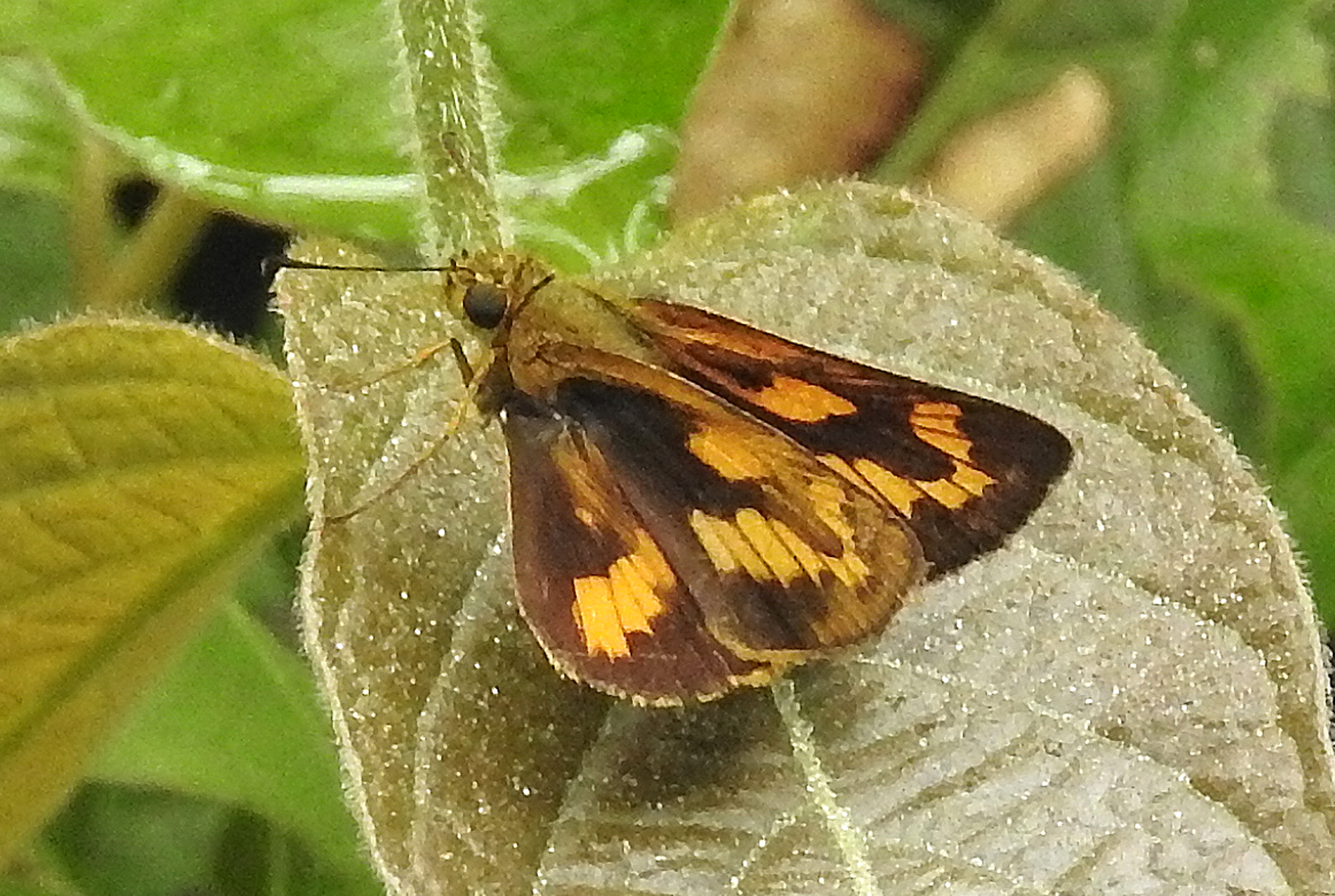
- India
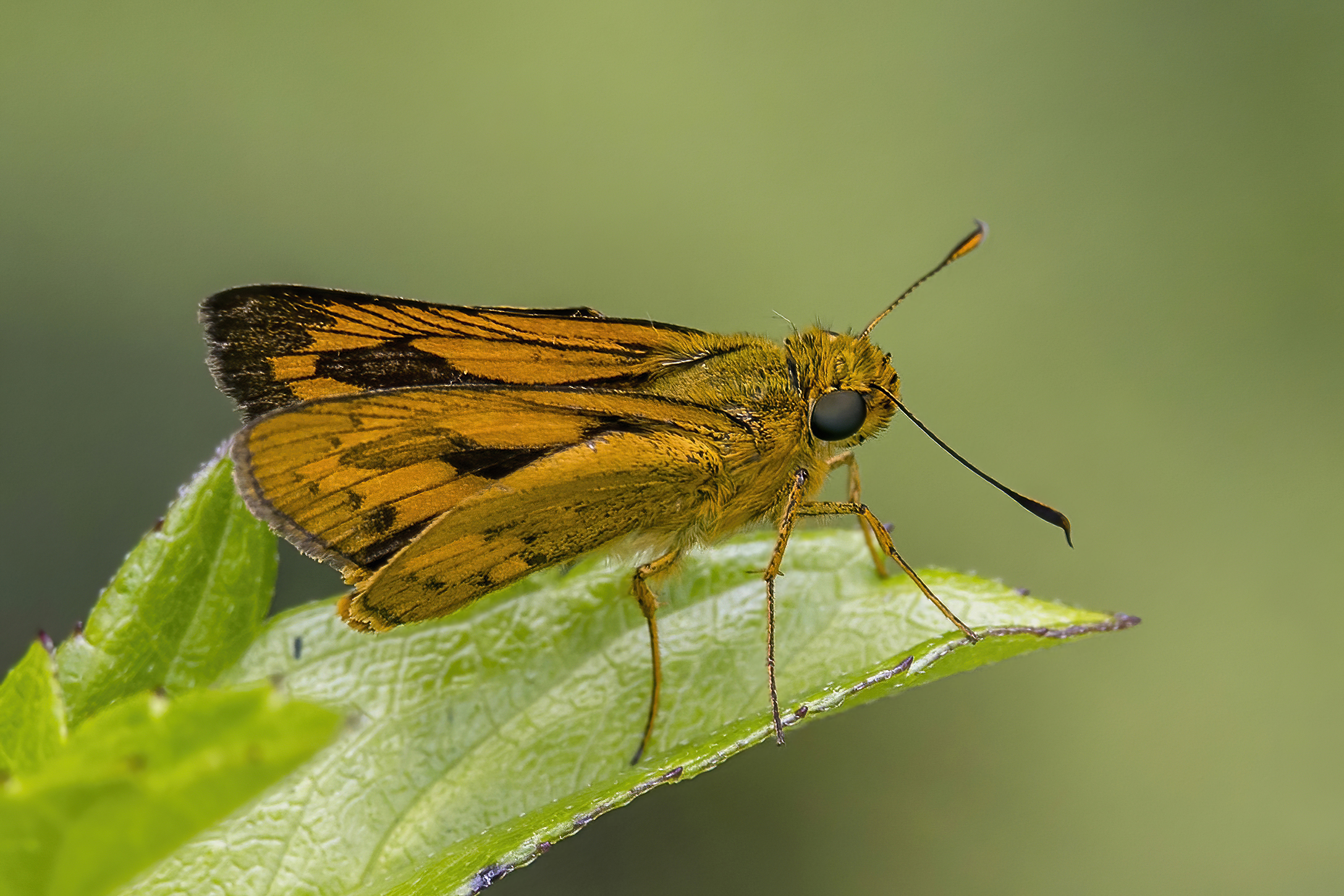
- T. b. lanka, Sri Lanka

Scientific classification
- Kingdom: Animalia
- Phylum: Arthropoda
- Clade: Pancrustacea
- Class: Insecta
- Order: Lepidoptera
- Family: Hesperiidae
- Genus: Telicota
- Species: T. bambusae

Binomial name
- Telicota bambusae (Moore, 1878)

Synonyms
- Pamphila bambusae Moore, 1878

= Telicota bambusae =

Species of butterfly

Telicota bambusae, the dark palm dart, is a species of grass skipper butterfly in the family Hesperiidae. It is found in India, Sri Lanka and on Peninsular Malaysia.

== Description ==
Male. Upperside. Forewing much as in Telicota augias, but the discal black band is narrower and more uniform, and is continued up to the outside of the upper end of the cell, where it terminates in a square patch, its outer side extending somewhat outwards, and the outer marginal black band is much broader and more uniform in width, expands at the apex and is complete and not macular as in T. augias, its inner edge irregular. Hindwing with the black portions blacker, the cell spot similar, the discal band and abdominal streak also similar, but the band is more uniform in width. Cilia similar. Underside like the underside of T. augias, the black markings more pronounced; the black spots on the hindwing indicating the discal patch much more prominent, and there is a blackish streak near the anal angle in each of the two anal interspaces. Antennae, palpi, head and body as in T. augias. Female like its own male, but on the upper.side the basal half of the cell of the forewing is usually black, and there is no cell spot in the hindwing.

— Charles Swinhoe, Lepidoptera Indica. Vol. X

== Subspecies ==
- Telicota bambusae bambusae (Moore, 1878) – Oriental Dark Palm-Dart
- Telicota bambusae horisha Evans, 1934
- Telicota bambusae lanka Evans, 1932
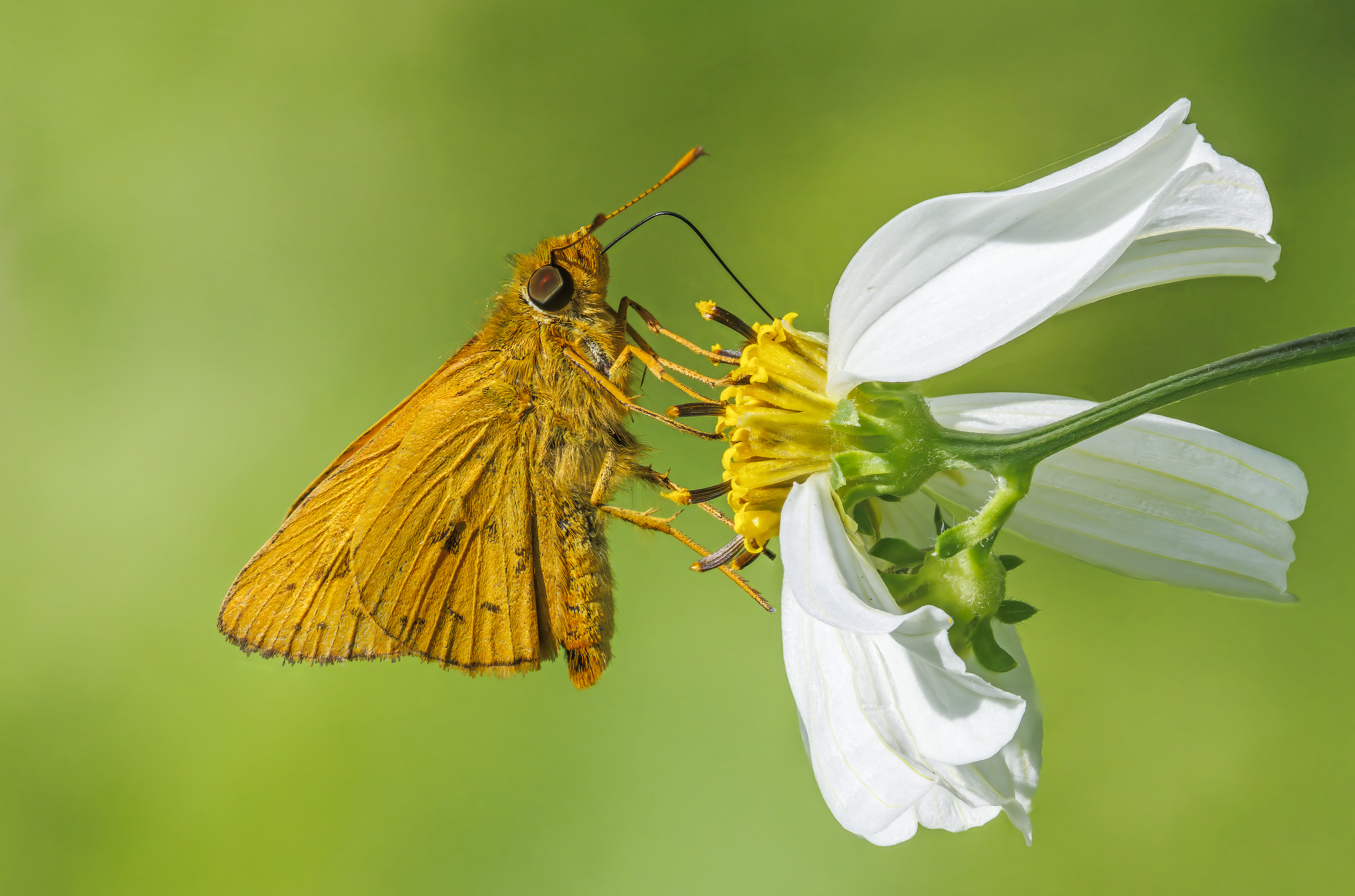
T. b. horisha underside, Taiwan

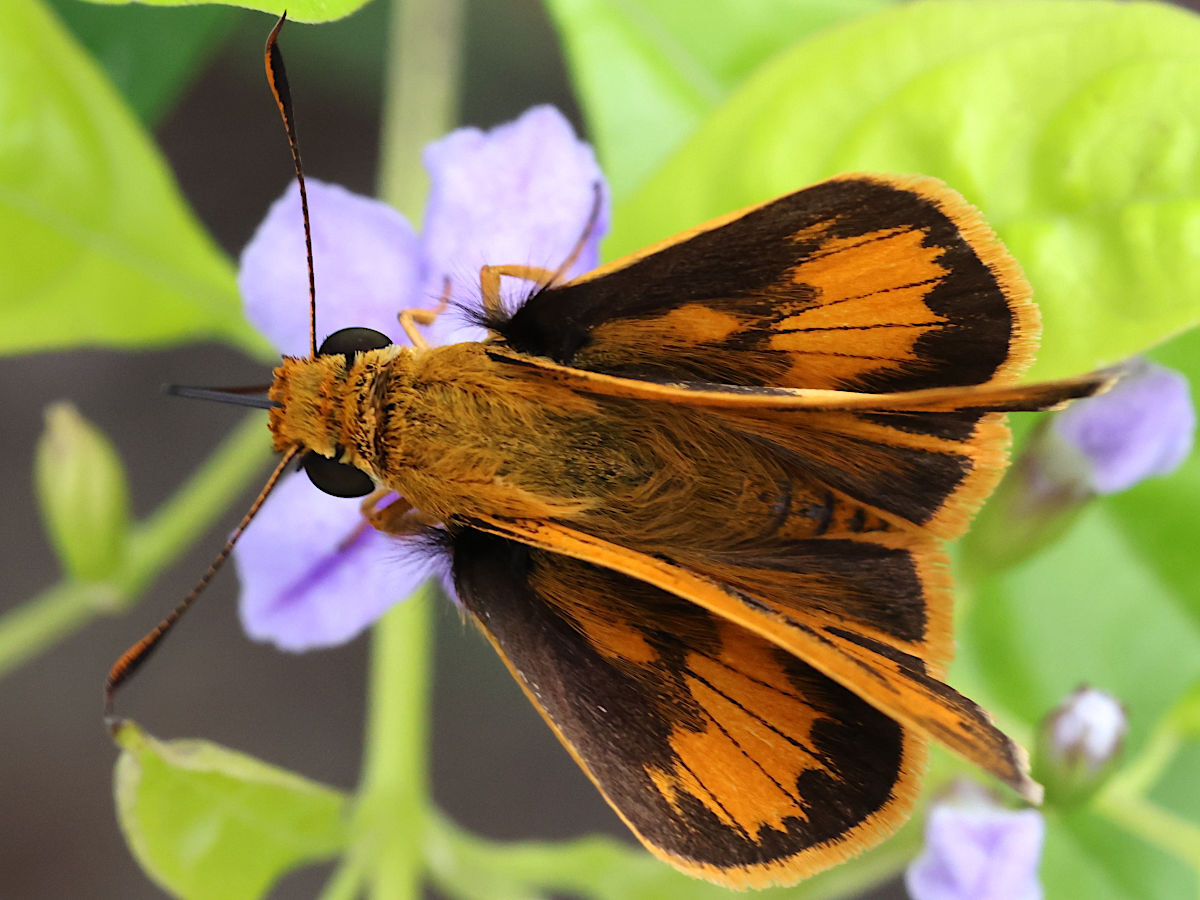
T. b. horisha upperside, Taiwan
