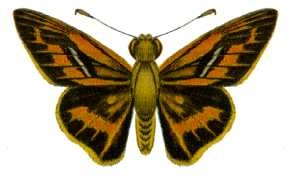

Scientific classification
- Kingdom: Animalia
- Phylum: Arthropoda
- Class: Insecta
- Order: Lepidoptera
- Family: Hesperiidae
- Genus: Telicota
- Species: T. anisodesma

Binomial name
- Telicota anisodesma Lower, 1911

= Telicota anisodesma =

Species of butterfly

Telicota anisodesma, the large darter or southern large darter, is a butterfly of the family Hesperiidae. It is found in Australia along the south-eastern coast of New South Wales and the north-eastern coast of Queensland.

The wingspan is about 30 mm.
