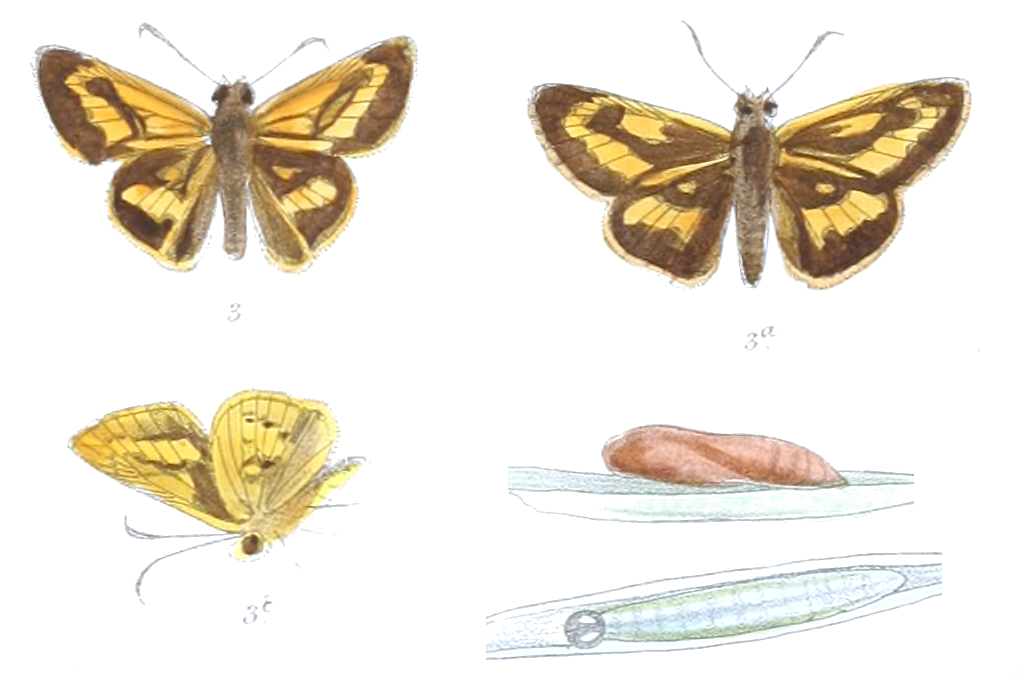
- Telicota bambusae

Scientific classification
- Kingdom: Animalia
- Phylum: Arthropoda
- Class: Insecta
- Order: Lepidoptera
- Family: Hesperiidae
- Tribe: Taractrocerini
- Genus: Telicota; Moore, [1881]

= Telicota =

Genus of butterflies

Telicota is a genus of grass skipper butterflies in the family Hesperiidae. It is a tropical Asian genus, shared between the Indomalayan realm and the Australasian realm, and ranging from Sri Lanka to Australia and New Guinea. Larval foodplants include Palmae and Gramineae - Miscanthus sinensis, Pennisetum purpureum, Oryza sativa (rice), Saccharum officinarum (sugar cane), Imperata cylindrica (lalang grass), Cocos nucifera (coconut) and Calamus (rattan). The species, all look very similar to each other and are often only reliably identifiable through the examination of the male genitalia.

== Species ==
- Telicota ancilla (Herrich-Schäffer, 1869)
- Telicota angiana Evans, 1934 New Guinea, Arfak Mts., 6,000 ft.
- Telicota anisodesma Lower, 1911
- Telicota aroa Evans, 1934 New Guinea, Aroa River, 5000 ft.
- Telicota augias (Linnaeus, 1763)
- Telicota bambusae (Moore, 1878)
- Telicota besta Evans, 1949 Hainan
- Telicota brachydesma Lower, 1908
- Telicota brandti Parsons, 1986 New Guinea, Sepik District, Maprik, 600 ft.
- Telicota bulwa Parsons, 1986 New Guinea, Morobe Province
- Telicota colon (Fabricius, 1775)
- Telicota doba Evans, 1949 Aru
- Telicota eurotas (C. Felder, 1860)
- Telicota eurychlora Lower, 1908
- Telicota gervasa Evans, 1949 Duke of York Island
- Telicota hilda Eliot, 1959 Malaya, Pahang
- Telicota kaimana Evans, 1934 New Guinea
- Telicota kezia Evans, 1949 New Guinea
- Telicota laruta Evans, 1934 Larut, Papua
- Telicota linna Evans, 1949 Sikkim
- Telicota melanion (Mabille, 1878) "Oceania".
- Telicota mesoptis Lower, 1911
- Telicota mimena Parsons, 1986 New Guinea, Morobe District
- Telicota ohara (Plötz, 1883)
- Telicota paceka Fruhstorfer, 1911 Dutch New Guinea
- Telicota sadra Evans, 1949 New Guinea
- Telicota sadrella Parsons, 1986 New Guinea, Sepik Province
- Telicota subha Fruhstorfer, 1911 Fergusson Island
- Telicota ternatensis Swinhoe, 1907 Indonesia, Maluku, Ternate
- Telicota torsa Evans, 1934 West Papua, "Buru"
- Telicota vinta Evans, 1949 West Papua, Kapaur
