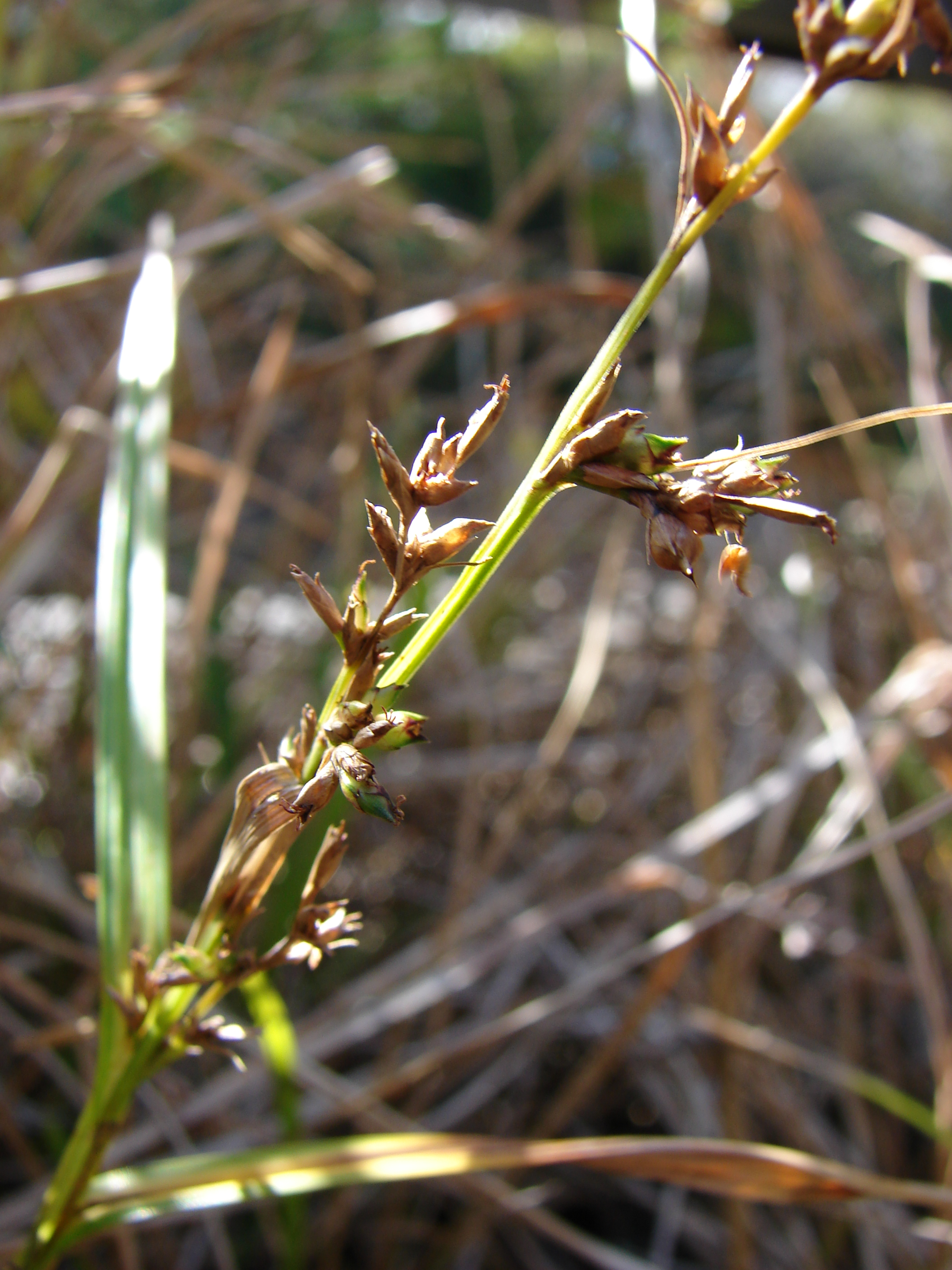
- Scleria testacea

Scientific classification
- Kingdom: Plantae
- Clade: Tracheophytes
- Clade: Angiosperms
- Clade: Monocots
- Clade: Commelinids
- Order: Poales
- Family: Cyperaceae
- Genus: Scleria; P.J.Bergius

Diversity
- About 200 species

= Scleria =

Genus of plants

Scleria is a genus of flowering plants in the sedge family, Cyperaceae. They are known commonly as nutrushes. They are distributed throughout the tropics, and some species have ranges extending into temperate areas. There are about 200 species.

== Etymology ==
The genus name Scleria is Greek, meaning "hardness", in reference to the tough seeds.

== Description ==
Plants of this genus are diverse in appearance. These are mostly perennial, but sometimes annual. Some have rhizomes. They produce solitary stems or clumps of many. They are a few centimeters tall to well over one meter. They have few leaves or many. The inflorescence is variable, ranging from a single spikelet to over 100. Despite the variety, examination of the fruits and subterranean structures is required to distinguish species.

== Selected species ==
- Scleria afroreflexa
- Scleria amazonica
- Scleria biflora
- Scleria bracteata
- Scleria ciliaris
- Scleria ciliata
- Scleria dregeana
- Scleria foliosa
- Scleria greigiifolia
- Scleria iostephana
- Scleria mackaviensis
- Scleria mikawana
- Scleria oligantha
- Scleria pauciflora
- Scleria poklei
- Scleria reticularis
- Scleria robinsoniana
- Scleria sumatrensis
- Scleria terrestris
- Scleria triglomerata
- Scleria verticillata
- Scleria vogelii
