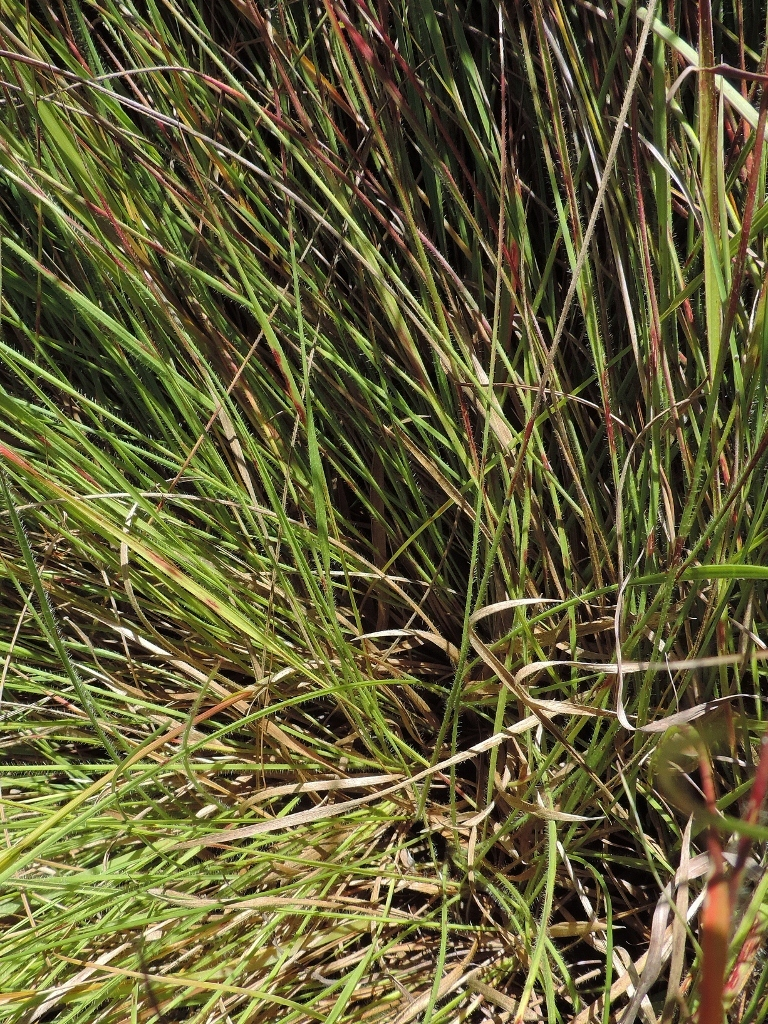
- In Zimbabwe

Conservation status
- Least Concern (IUCN 3.1)

Scientific classification
- Kingdom: Plantae
- Clade: Embryophytes
- Clade: Tracheophytes
- Clade: Angiosperms
- Clade: Monocots
- Clade: Commelinids
- Order: Poales
- Family: Cyperaceae
- Genus: Scleria
- Species: S. foliosa

Binomial name
- Scleria foliosa Hochst. ex A.Rich.

Synonyms
- Scleria dumicola Ridl.; Scleria foliosa var. major Oliv.; Scleria ovuligera Rchb. ex Steud.; Scleria perrieri Cherm.

= Scleria foliosa =

Species of grass-like plant

Scleria foliosa is a plant in the family Cyperaceae. It grows as an annual or perennial.

== Distribution and habitat ==
Scleria foliosa grows widely in Africa, including in Madagascar. One plant has been reported from India's Karnataka state. Its habitat is seasonal wet areas and shaded areas near water.
