= Scleria afroreflexa =

Conservation status
- Endangered (IUCN 3.1)

Scientific classification
- Kingdom: Plantae
- Clade: Tracheophytes
- Clade: Angiosperms
- Clade: Monocots
- Clade: Commelinids
- Order: Poales
- Family: Cyperaceae
- Genus: Scleria
- Species: S. afroreflexa

Binomial name
- Scleria afroreflexa Lye

Species of grass-like plant

Scleria afroreflexa is a species of flowering plant in the family Cyperaceae. It is endemic to Cameroon. It grows on mountain grasslands, including areas of grassland in forested regions. It is threatened by the deliberate burning of the grassland habitat. This plant was first collected in 1999.
