= Scleria iostephana =

Conservation status
- Least Concern (IUCN 3.1)

Scientific classification
- Kingdom: Plantae
- Clade: Tracheophytes
- Clade: Angiosperms
- Clade: Monocots
- Clade: Commelinids
- Order: Poales
- Family: Cyperaceae
- Genus: Scleria
- Species: S. iostephana

Binomial name
- Scleria iostephana Nelmes

Species of grass-like plant

Scleria iostephana is a plant in the family Cyperaceae. It grows as a stout perennial sedge up to 2 metres (6 ft 7 in) high.

== Distribution and habitat ==
Scleria iostephana grows naturally in tropical Africa. Its habitat is forests, woodlands, grasslands, bogs and marshes.
