= Scleria vogelii =

Conservation status
- Least Concern (IUCN 3.1)

Scientific classification
- Kingdom: Plantae
- Clade: Tracheophytes
- Clade: Angiosperms
- Clade: Monocots
- Clade: Commelinids
- Order: Poales
- Family: Cyperaceae
- Genus: Scleria
- Species: S. vogelii

Binomial name
- Scleria vogelii C.B.Clarke

Species of grass-like plant

Scleria vogelii is a stout perennial plant in the sedge family Cyperaceae. It grows naturally from western to central Africa in savanna and swampy forests.
