= Scleria ciliata =

Scientific classification
- Kingdom: Plantae
- Clade: Embryophytes
- Clade: Tracheophytes
- Clade: Angiosperms
- Clade: Monocots
- Clade: Commelinids
- Order: Poales
- Family: Cyperaceae
- Genus: Scleria
- Species: S. ciliata

Binomial name
- Scleria ciliata Michx.

Species of perennial sedge

Scleria ciliata, commonly known as fringed nutrush or hairy nutrush, is a species of perennial sedge found in North, Central, and South America. There are two varieties of S. ciliata: Scleria pauciflora Muhl. ex Willd. var. curtissii (Britton) Fairey and Scleria brittonii Core ex Small.

== Description ==
Scleria ciliata reaches a height between 20 and 70 cm (8 and 28 in). Culms are erect, and can occur in tufts. They may be either glabrous or hairy. Leaves come from purplish sheaths, with linear blades ranging in width from 1 to 7 mm (0.04 to 0.28 in).

Inflorescence is terminal and axillary, with clusters ranging from few to many-clustered with a width of 5 to 10 mm (0.2 to 0.4 in). Blooms occur from May to August. S. ciliata produces achenes that are white to brown in color.

== Distribution and habitat ==
Within North America, S. ciliata can be found in the southeastern region of the United States, its range stretching from Virginia south to Florida and westward to Texas, Oklahoma, Kansas, and Missouri.

S. ciliata occurs in wet to dry soils, in habitats such as in pinelands and thickets.
