= Scleria mikawana =

Conservation status
- Least Concern (IUCN 3.1)

Scientific classification
- Kingdom: Plantae
- Clade: Tracheophytes
- Clade: Angiosperms
- Clade: Monocots
- Clade: Commelinids
- Order: Poales
- Family: Cyperaceae
- Genus: Scleria
- Species: S. mikawana

Binomial name
- Scleria mikawana Makino

Synonyms
- Scleria glabroreticulata De Wild.

Species of grass-like plant

Scleria mikawana is a species of flowering plant in the family Cyperaceae. It grows as a tall, slender annual sedge.

== Description ==
Scleria mikawana grows up to 120 centimetres (47 in) tall. The leaves measure 3 to 7 millimetres (0.1 to 0.3 in) wide.

== Distribution and habitat ==
It is native to Angola, Bangladesh, Burkina Faso, Burundi, Central African Republic, Chad, Democratic Republic of the Congo, Gabon, Guinea-Bissau, India, Ivory Coast, Japan, New Guinea, Republic of the Congo, Senegal, Sierra Leone, Sri Lanka, Thailand, Uganda, and Zambia. Its habitat is wet grassy locales and swamps.
