= Scleria poklei =

Conservation status
- Data Deficient (IUCN 3.1)

Scientific classification
- Kingdom: Plantae
- Clade: Tracheophytes
- Clade: Angiosperms
- Clade: Monocots
- Clade: Commelinids
- Order: Poales
- Family: Cyperaceae
- Genus: Scleria
- Species: S. poklei

Binomial name
- Scleria poklei Wad.Khan

Species of grass-like plant

Scleria poklei is a plant in the family Cyperaceae. It is named for the Indian botanist Dileep Sadashivrao Pokle.

== Distribution and habitat ==
Scleria poklei is endemic to India's Maharashtra state. Its habitat is wet grasslands, rice fields and forest clearings.
