= Scleria amazonica =

Scientific classification
- Kingdom: Plantae
- Clade: Tracheophytes
- Clade: Angiosperms
- Clade: Monocots
- Clade: Commelinids
- Order: Poales
- Family: Cyperaceae
- Genus: Scleria
- Species: S. amazonica

Binomial name
- Scleria amazonica Camelb., M.T. Strong & Goetgh.

Species of grass-like plant

Scleria amazonica is a plant species native to the State of Amazonas in southern Venezuela.

Scleria amazonica is a perennial herb spreading by means of underground rhizomes. Stem is triangular in cross-section, up to 120 cm tall. Leaves are up to 45 cm long, with a V-shaped ligule of dense hairs. Inflorescences unisexual, in a paniculate arrangement, up to 46 cm long. Achenes have a course network of raised decorations on the surface.
