= Scleria greigiifolia =

Conservation status
- Least Concern (IUCN 3.1)

Scientific classification
- Kingdom: Plantae
- Clade: Tracheophytes
- Clade: Angiosperms
- Clade: Monocots
- Clade: Commelinids
- Order: Poales
- Family: Cyperaceae
- Genus: Scleria
- Species: S. greigiifolia

Binomial name
- Scleria greigiifolia (Ridl.) C.B.Clarke

Synonyms
- Acriulus greigiifolius Ridl.; Acriulus madagascariensis Ridl.; Acriulus titan C.B.Clarke; Scleria acriulus C.B.Clarke; Scleria friesii Kük.

Species of grass-like plant

Scleria greigiifolia is a plant in the family Cyperaceae. It grows as a perennial herb.

== Distribution and habitat ==
Scleria greigiifolia grows naturally in central to southern Africa and Madagascar. Its habitat is dambos, bogs, wet places near streams and lakes, and seasonally flooded grasslands. It has been recorded at altitudes from 500 metres (1,600 ft) to 1,800 metres (6,000 ft).
