= Scleria dregeana =

Conservation status
- Least Concern (IUCN 3.1)

Scientific classification
- Kingdom: Plantae
- Clade: Tracheophytes
- Clade: Angiosperms
- Clade: Monocots
- Clade: Commelinids
- Order: Poales
- Family: Cyperaceae
- Genus: Scleria
- Species: S. dregeana

Binomial name
- Scleria dregeana Kunth

Synonyms
- Scleria caespitosa Ridl.; Scleria holcoides Kunth; Scleria meyeriana Kunth; Scleria setulosa Boeckeler

Species of grass-like plant

Scleria dregeana is a plant in the family Cyperaceae. It grows as a perennial herb.

== Distribution and habitat ==
Scleria dregeana grows widely in southern Africa. Its habitat is wet places at high altitude.
