= Scleria biflora =

Conservation status
- Least Concern (IUCN 3.1)

Scientific classification
- Kingdom: Plantae
- Clade: Tracheophytes
- Clade: Angiosperms
- Clade: Monocots
- Clade: Commelinids
- Order: Poales
- Family: Cyperaceae
- Genus: Scleria
- Species: S. biflora

Binomial name
- Scleria biflora Roxb.

Synonyms
- Scleria biflora subsp. ferruginea J.Kern; Scleria propinqua Steud.; Scleria steudeliana Miq.

Species of grass-like plant

Scleria biflora is a plant in the family Cyperaceae. It grows as a tufted annual grass.

== Distribution and habitat ==
Scleria biflora grows widely in India, Sri Lanka, Nepal, China, Taiwan, Japan, Burma, Thailand, Vietnam, Indonesia, Malaysia and Philippines. Its habitat is most frequently in moist, shady places, and sometimes in wet scrubland and in rice fields. It is found from sea level to 2,040 metres (6,700 ft) altitude.
