= Scleria oligantha =

Scientific classification
- Kingdom: Plantae
- Clade: Tracheophytes
- Clade: Angiosperms
- Clade: Monocots
- Clade: Commelinids
- Order: Poales
- Family: Cyperaceae
- Genus: Scleria
- Species: S. oligantha

Binomial name
- Scleria oligantha Michx.

Species of plant found in the Americas

Scleria oligantha, commonly known as littlehead nutrush or few-flowered nutrush, is a species of perennial graminoid found in North and Central America.

== Description ==
Scleria oligantha possesses erect culms that most commonly occur in tufts, reaching between 30 and 60 centimeters (approximately 11.81 to 23.62 inches) in height. Leaf blades are ribbed and linear, usually shorter in length than the culms, with a width of 2 to 6 millimeters. Flowering stems may be red to purple at their base.

Inflorescence is axillary and terminal, occurring in 2 to 5 small clusters, each with 1 to 4 spikelets. S. oligantha fruits from spring into the summer producing achenes that range in color from white to grayish brown.

== Distribution and habitat ==
Within the United States, S. oligantha can be found from Ohio south to Florida and westward to Texas and Oklahoma. There are also populations present in Mexico, Guatemala, and Honduras.

This species can be found in mesic to xeric environments, in habitats such as forests, meadows, and swamp forests.
