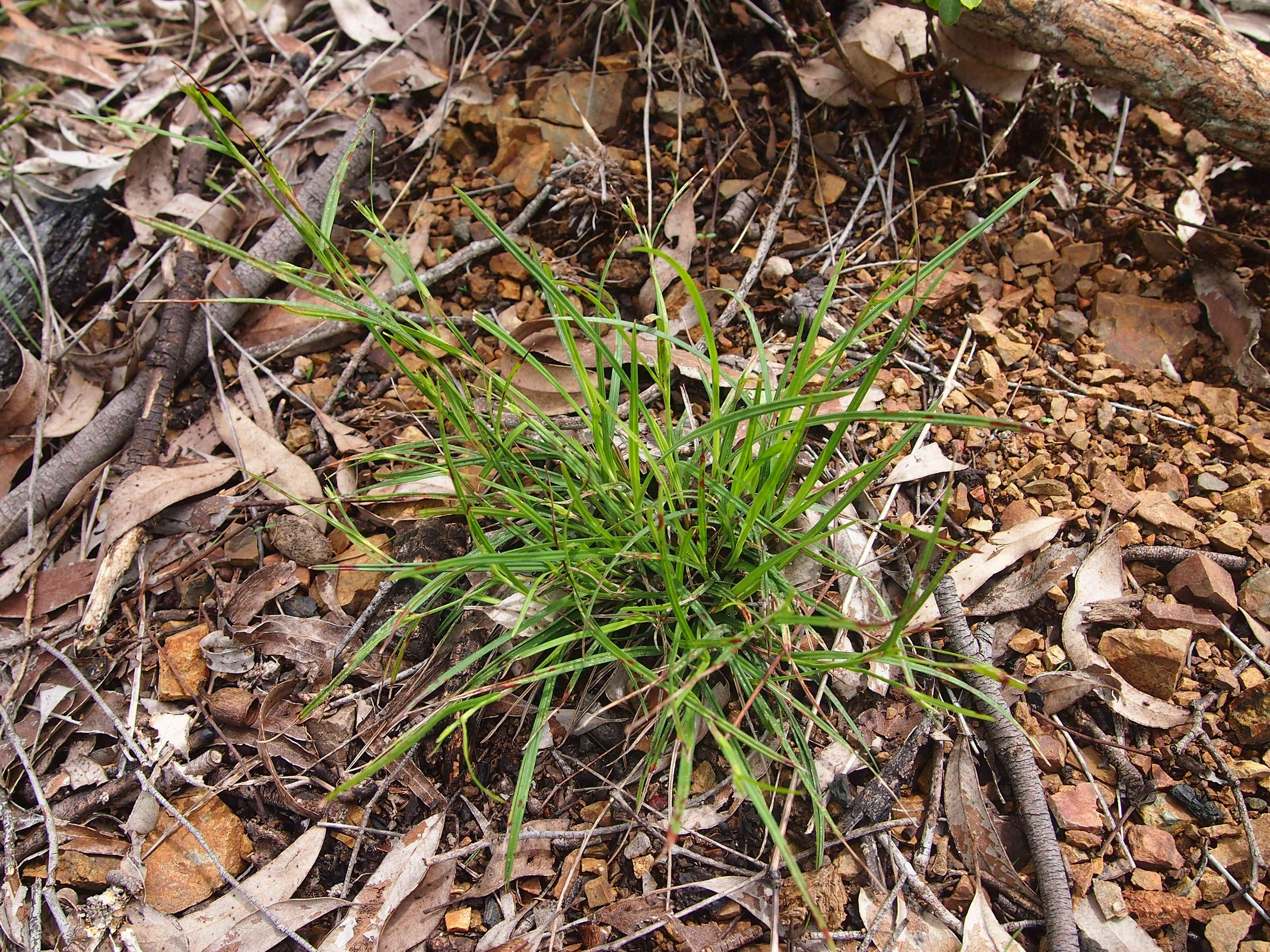

Conservation status
- Least Concern (IUCN 3.1)

Scientific classification
- Kingdom: Plantae
- Clade: Tracheophytes
- Clade: Angiosperms
- Clade: Monocots
- Clade: Commelinids
- Order: Poales
- Family: Cyperaceae
- Genus: Scleria
- Species: S. mackaviensis

Binomial name
- Scleria mackaviensis Boeckeler

= Scleria mackaviensis =

Species of grass-like plant

Scleria mackaviensis is a plant in the family Cyperaceae. It grows as a tufted sedge.

== Description ==
Scleria mackaviensis has green spikelets. The plant flowers in spring and summer.

== Distribution and habitat ==
Scleria mackaviensis is endemic to eastern Australia where it grows widely in the coastal regions of Queensland and New South Wales. Its varied habitat includes rainforest, scrublands, ridges, rocky hillsides and mountain slopes.
