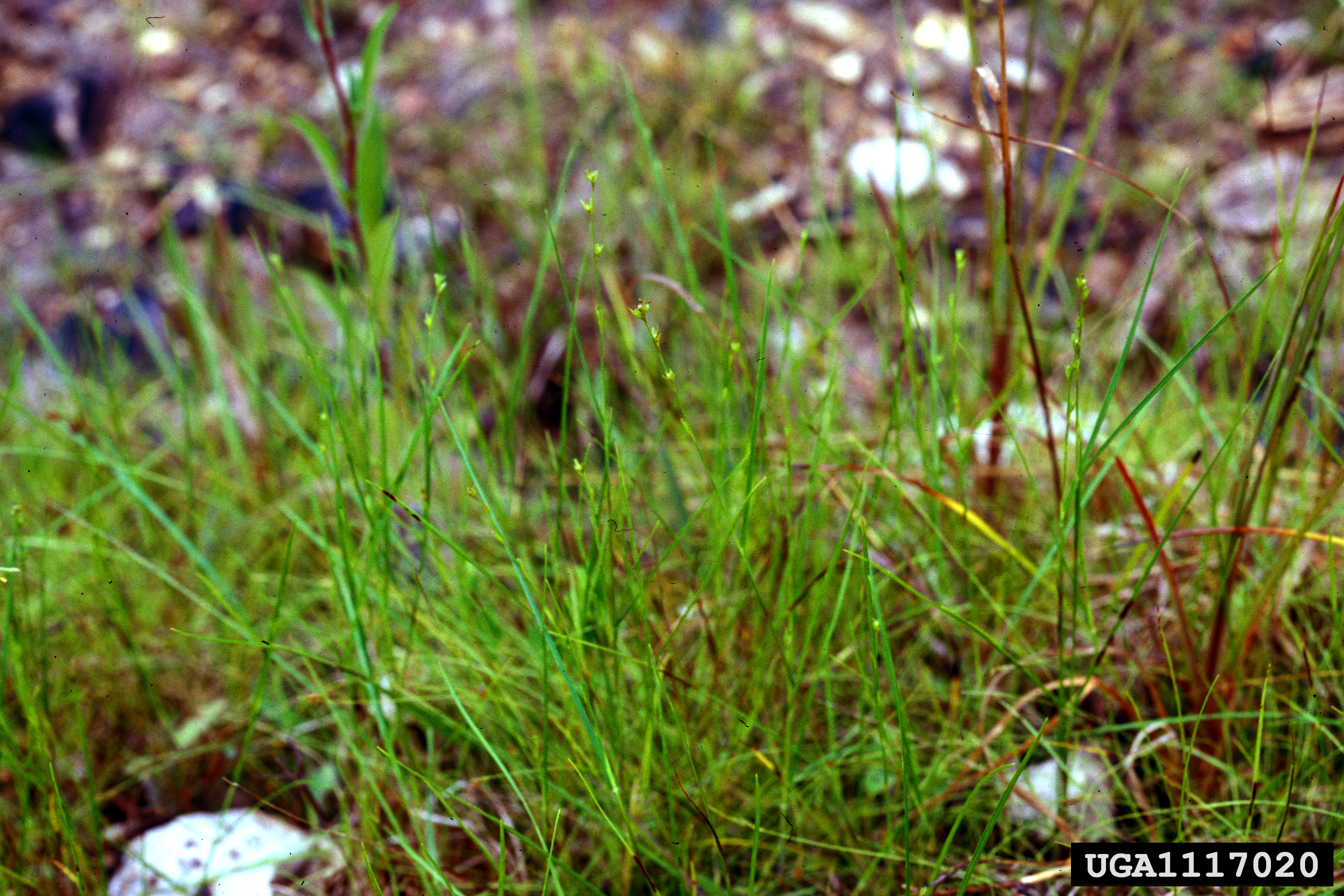

Scientific classification
- Kingdom: Plantae
- Clade: Tracheophytes
- Clade: Angiosperms
- Clade: Monocots
- Clade: Commelinids
- Order: Poales
- Family: Cyperaceae
- Genus: Scleria
- Species: S. verticillata

Binomial name
- Scleria verticillata Muhl. ex Willd.

= Scleria verticillata =

Species of grass-like plant

Scleria verticillata, known as low nutrush or whorled nutrush, is a plant in the sedge family Cyperaceae. It is native to Ontario, Canada, the eastern United States, The Bahamas, and Cuba.

== Conservation status ==
It is listed as endangered in Maryland, New Jersey, New York (state), and in Pennsylvania. It is listed as threatened in Arkansas, Iowa, and Minnesota, and as a special concern in Tennessee. It is listed as a special concern and believed extirpated in Connecticut.

In Canada, it is only known from Ontario, where it is listed as an S3 species (Vulnerable).
