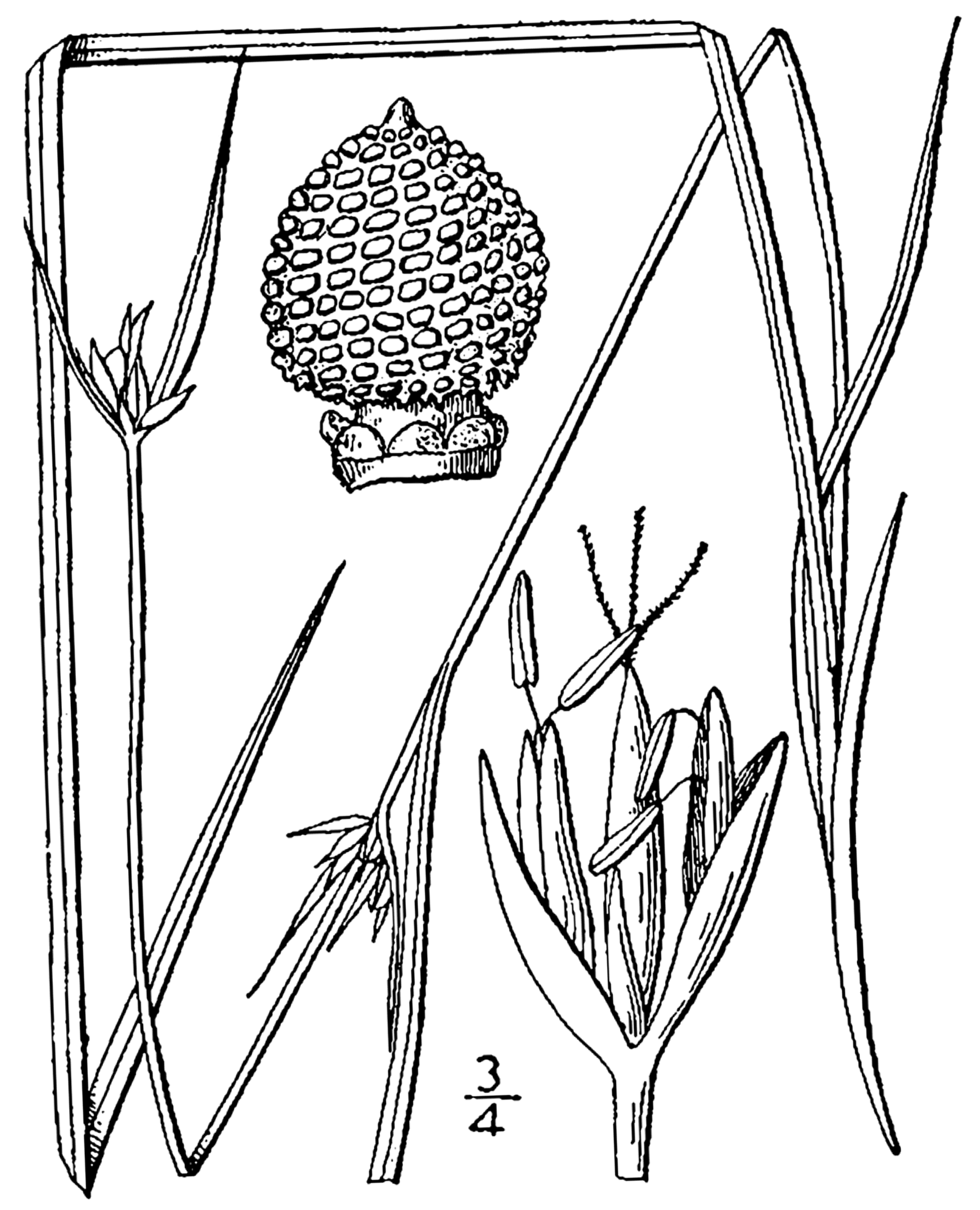
- 1913 illustration

Scientific classification
- Kingdom: Plantae
- Clade: Tracheophytes
- Clade: Angiosperms
- Clade: Monocots
- Clade: Commelinids
- Order: Poales
- Family: Cyperaceae
- Genus: Scleria
- Species: S. pauciflora

Binomial name
- Scleria pauciflora Muhl. ex Willd.

= Scleria pauciflora =

Species of grass-like plant

Scleria pauciflora, known as few-flowered nutrush, papillose nut-sedge, and Carolina-whipgrass, is a plant in the sedge family (Cyperaceae) native to northern Mexico, the eastern United States, southern Canada, and Cuba. It is common across a broad stretch of the southeastern United States in many different habitat types, becoming rare at the northern end of its distribution. It has been observed to occur in habitats such as pine savannas, wet and dry pine flatwoods, slashpine woods, and along boggy riverbanks.

== Taxonomy ==
It was first formally described in 1805. Three varieties are accepted:

- Scleria pauciflora var. caroliniana Alph.Wood
- Scleria pauciflora var. curtissii (Britton) Fairey
- Scleria pauciflora var. pauciflora

== Conservation status ==
It is listed as endangered in Massachusetts and Michigan and as threatened in Ohio, Pennsylvania, and Rhode Island. In Canada, it is only known from Ontario, where it is listed as an S1 species (Critically Imperiled).

The variety Scleria pauciflora var. caroliniana is listed as endangered in Connecticut.
