= Scleria robinsoniana =

Conservation status
- Near Threatened (IUCN 3.1)

Scientific classification
- Kingdom: Plantae
- Clade: Tracheophytes
- Clade: Angiosperms
- Clade: Monocots
- Clade: Commelinids
- Order: Poales
- Family: Cyperaceae
- Genus: Scleria
- Species: S. robinsoniana

Binomial name
- Scleria robinsoniana J.Raynal

Species of grass-like plant

Scleria robinsoniana is a plant in the nutrush genus Scleria of the sedge family Cyperaceae.

== Distribution and habitat ==
Scleria robinsoniana grows naturally in Guinea, Sierra Leone and the Central African Republic. Its habitat is seasonally wet stony areas from sea-level to 1,200 metres (4,000 ft) altitude.
