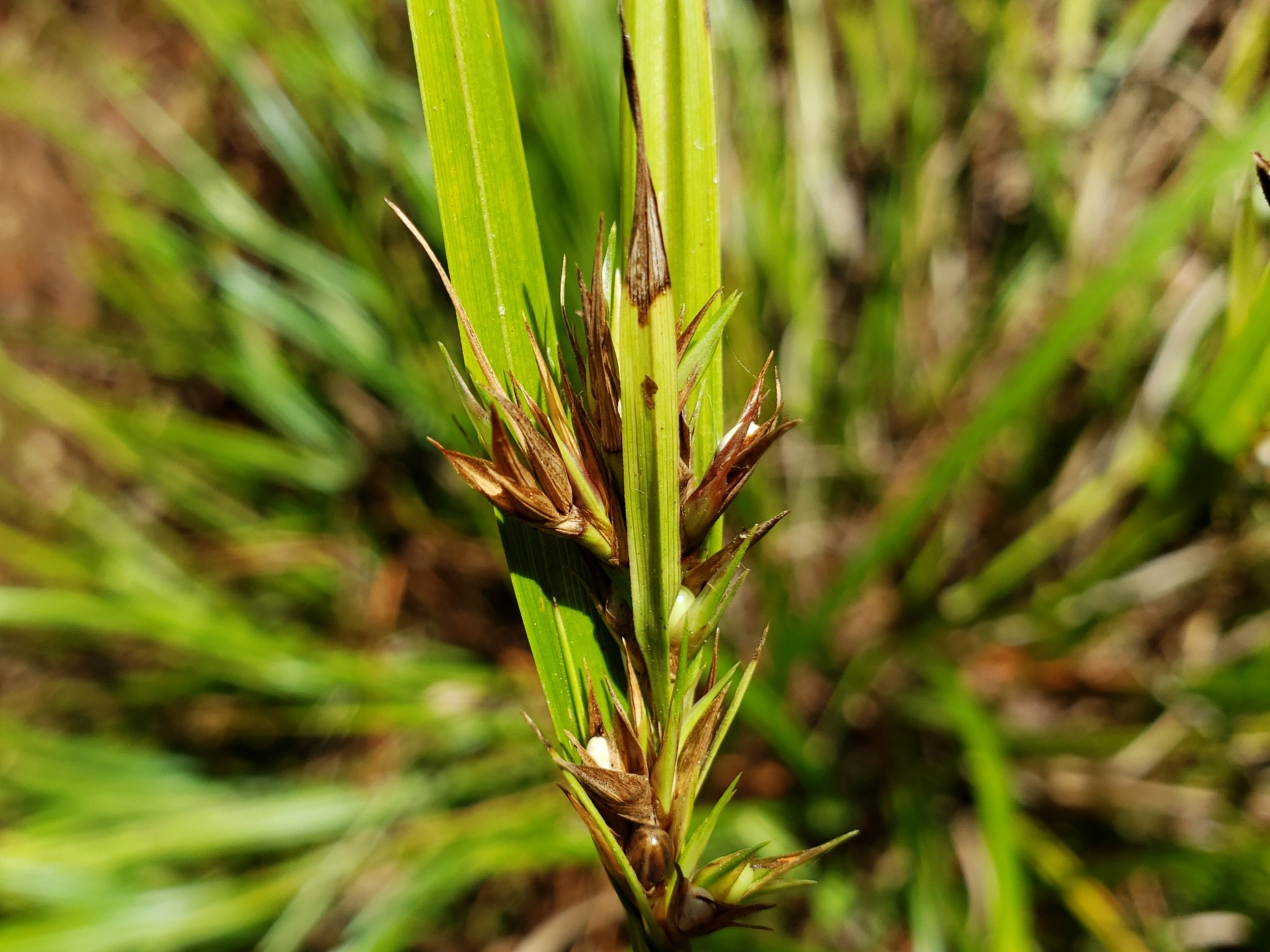

Conservation status
- Least Concern (IUCN 3.1)

Scientific classification
- Kingdom: Plantae
- Clade: Tracheophytes
- Clade: Angiosperms
- Clade: Monocots
- Clade: Commelinids
- Order: Poales
- Family: Cyperaceae
- Genus: Scleria
- Species: S. triglomerata

Binomial name
- Scleria triglomerata Michx.

Synonyms
- Cladium triglomeratum (Michx.) Nees; Schoenus inermis Willd. ex Kunth; Scleria flaccida Steud.; Scleria nitida Willd. ex Kunth; Trachylomia triglomerata (Michx.) Nees

= Scleria triglomerata =

Species of grass-like plant

Scleria triglomerata, also known as the whip nutrush, is a plant in the sedge family Cyperaceae.

== Distribution and habitat ==
Scleria triglomerata grows naturally throughout the United States and also in Canada. Its habitat is varied, including oak and pine woods, thickets, rocky areas and prairies.
