= Scleria bracteata =

Conservation status
- Least Concern (IUCN 3.1)

Scientific classification
- Kingdom: Plantae
- Clade: Tracheophytes
- Clade: Angiosperms
- Clade: Monocots
- Clade: Commelinids
- Order: Poales
- Family: Cyperaceae
- Genus: Scleria
- Species: S. bracteata

Binomial name
- Scleria bracteata Cav.

Synonyms
- List: *Macrolomia bracteata (Cav.) Schrad. ex Nees; *Scleria bracteata var. floribunda (Kunth) H.Pfeiff.; *Scleria bracteata f. simplicior Kük.; *Scleria bracteata var. supra-gynacea J.Pfeiff.; *Scleria bracteata f. supra-gynaecea H.Pfeiff.; *Scleria bracteata f. supragynaecea H.Pfeiff.; *Scleria floribunda Kunth; *Scleria papillata Willd. ex Kunth; *Scleria rigens Steud.

Species of grass-like plant

Scleria bracteata, the bracted nutrush, is a plant in the family Cyperaceae. It grows as a perennial climber.

== Distribution and habitat ==
Scleria bracteata grows widely in Mexico, Central America and tropical South America. It is considered a species of least concern on the IUCN Red List due to its broad range. Its habitat includes wet forest, bush savanna, and riparian areas.
