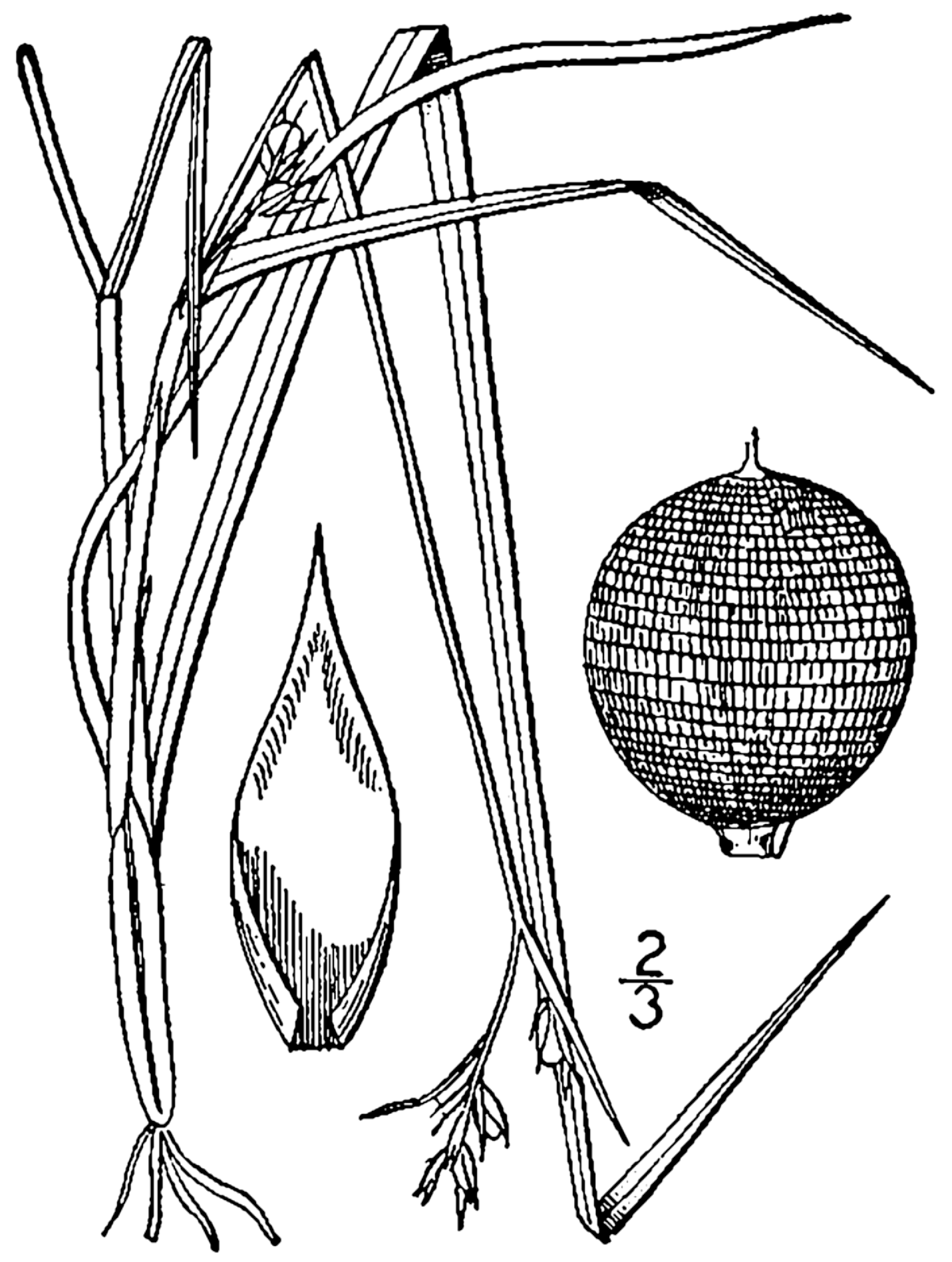
- 1913 illustration

Conservation status
- Least Concern (IUCN 3.1)

Scientific classification
- Kingdom: Plantae
- Clade: Tracheophytes
- Clade: Angiosperms
- Clade: Monocots
- Clade: Commelinids
- Order: Poales
- Family: Cyperaceae
- Genus: Scleria
- Species: S. reticularis

Binomial name
- Scleria reticularis Michx.

Synonyms
- Scleria jelskiana Boeckeler; Scleria muhlenbergiana Liebm.; Scleria trichopoda C.Wright ex Britton

= Scleria reticularis =

Species of grass-like plant

Scleria reticularis, also known as the reticulated nutrush or netted nutrush, is a plant in the sedge family Cyperaceae.

== Distribution and habitat ==
Scleria reticularis grows naturally in the southern, central and eastern United States. Its habitat is bogs and wetlands from sea-level to 500 metres (1,600 ft) altitude. It has been observed in environments such as mesic mixed hardwood systems, depression marshes, and both mesic and dry savannas.
