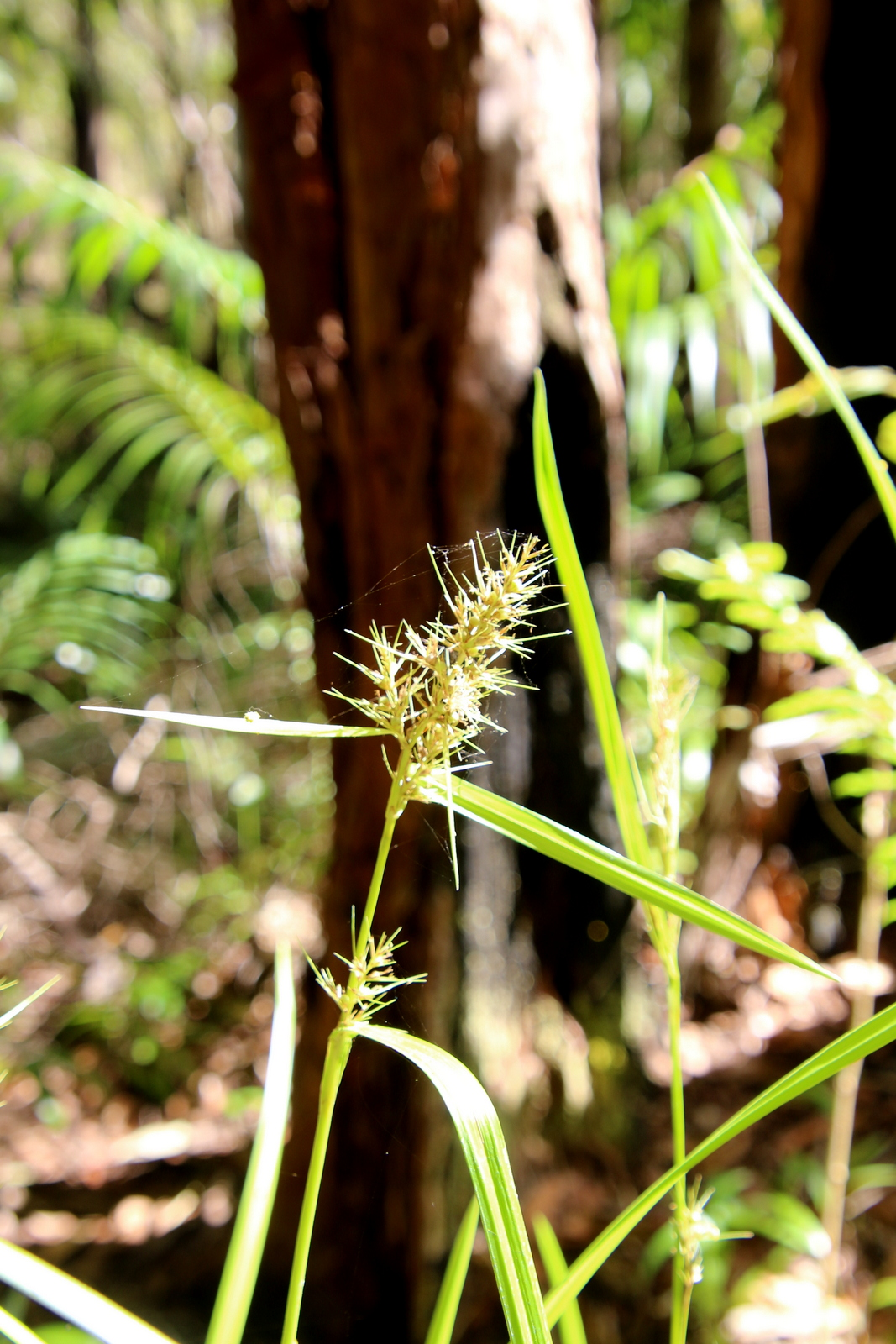
- Litchfield National Park, Australia

Conservation status
- Least Concern (IUCN 3.1)

Scientific classification
- Kingdom: Plantae
- Clade: Tracheophytes
- Clade: Angiosperms
- Clade: Monocots
- Clade: Commelinids
- Order: Poales
- Family: Cyperaceae
- Genus: Scleria
- Species: S. ciliaris

Binomial name
- Scleria ciliaris Nees

Synonyms
- Scleria chinensis

= Scleria ciliaris =

Species of flowering plant

Scleria ciliaris, the nutrush, is a tropical perennial plant in the sedge family Cyperaceae. It is often found in moist sites in Australia, Malesia, Indo-China and Oceania.
