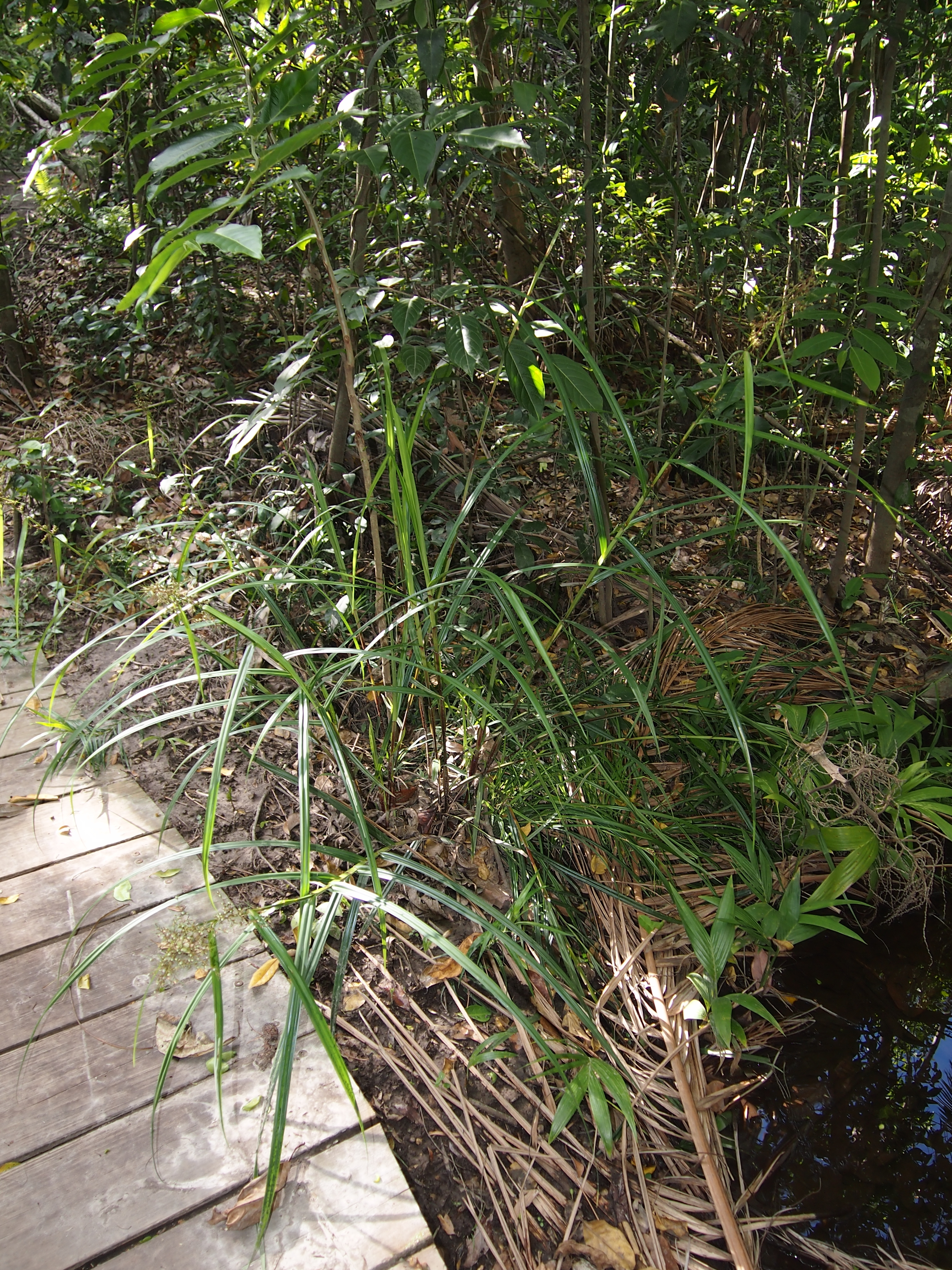

Conservation status
- Least Concern (IUCN 3.1)

Scientific classification
- Kingdom: Plantae
- Clade: Tracheophytes
- Clade: Angiosperms
- Clade: Monocots
- Clade: Commelinids
- Order: Poales
- Family: Cyperaceae
- Genus: Scleria
- Species: S. terrestris

Binomial name
- Scleria terrestris (L.) Fassett

Synonyms
- Scleria cochinchinensis Scleria doederleiniana Scleria elata Zizania terrestris

= Scleria terrestris =

Species of grass-like plant

Scleria terrestris is a species of flowering plant in the family Cyperaceae, the sedges. It is native to much of Asia and Australia, where it is widespread and occasional. It is a rhizomatous perennial herb that grows in wet habitat, such as streambanks and wet mountain understory, and some types of dry and disturbed habitat.
