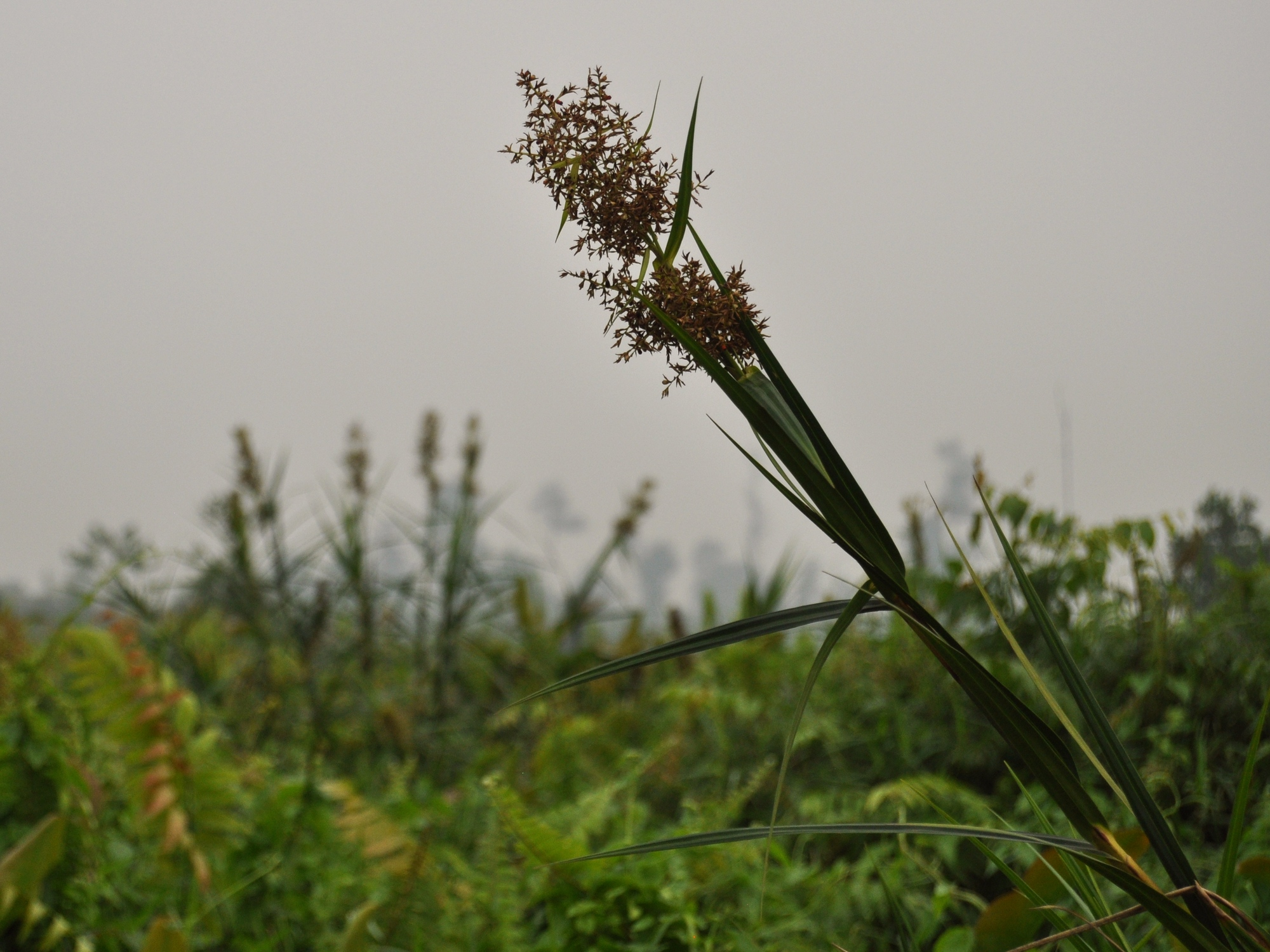
- Scleria sumatrensis Rokan Hilir, Riau, Indonesia

Scientific classification
- Kingdom: Plantae
- Clade: Tracheophytes
- Clade: Angiosperms
- Clade: Monocots
- Clade: Commelinids
- Order: Poales
- Family: Cyperaceae
- Genus: Scleria
- Species: S. sumatrensis

Binomial name
- Scleria sumatrensis Retz.

= Scleria sumatrensis =

Species of grass-like plant

Scleria sumatrensis, commonly known as nutrush and Sumatran scleria, is a plant species in the sedge family. It is native to temperate and tropical Asia (in China, India, Malesia, and Sri Lanka), where it is usually found growing in wetlands, and is considered a noxious weed on the island of Borneo. It has been used in traditional medicine against gonorrhea.
