= Carl Ludwig Willdenow =

German botanist (1765–1812)

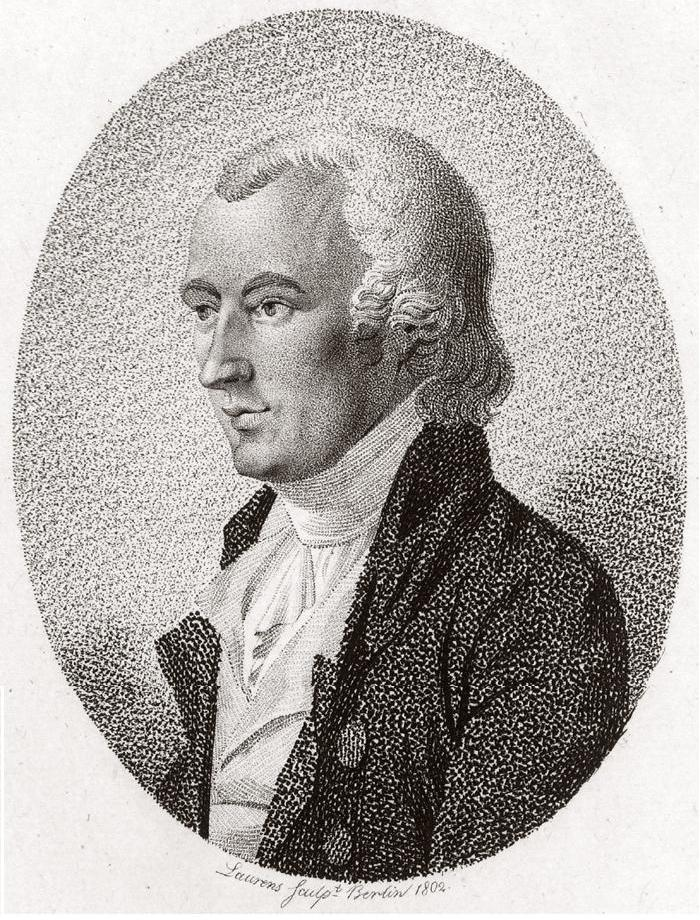
- Born: 22 August 1765; Berlin, Kingdom of Prussia, Holy Roman Empire
- Died: 10 July 1812 (aged 46); Berlin, Kingdom of Prussia
- Education: University of Halle
- Relatives: Johann Gottlieb Gleditsch (uncle)
- Scientific career
- Fields: botany pharmacy taxonomy
- Institutions: Humboldt University of Berlin
- Author abbrev. (botany): Willd.

Carl Ludwig Willdenow (22 August 1765 – 10 July 1812) was a German botanist, pharmacist, and plant taxonomist. He is considered one of the founders of phytogeography, the study of the geographic distribution of plants. Willdenow was also a mentor of Alexander von Humboldt, one of the earliest and best known phytogeographers. He also influenced Christian Konrad Sprengel, who pioneered the study of plant pollination and floral biology.

== Biography ==
Willdenow was born in Berlin to pharmacist Johann Carl (1737-1790) and Dorothea Louise Budde (1731-1786). His mother's father was the royal physician August Budde. His father became the owner of the Zum Rothen Adler pharmacy on Unter den Linden. After studying at a Latin school and at the Werder Gymnasium he apprenticed at his father's pharmacy. His early interest in botany was kindled by his uncle J. G. Gleditsch and he started a herbarium in his teenage years, sometimes joining Kurt Sprengel on excursions. He took instructions in chemistry from Martin Heinrich Klaproth. He studied pharmaceutics at Wieglieb College, Langensalza and from 1785, medicine at the University of Halle. He received a doctorate in 1789 with a dissertation under Philipp Friedrich Theodor Meckel on medicinal plants. He returned to Berlin to work at his father's pharmacy which he operated after the death of his father and ran it until 1793. In 1790 he married Henriette Luise Habermus. In 1794, he became a member of the Berlin Academy of Sciences. He was made director of the royal Botanical garden of Berlin (it was then located at the Kleistpark) from 1801 until his death. In 1807, Alexander von Humboldt helped to expand the garden. There he studied many South American plants, brought back by Humboldt. He was interested in the adaptation of plants to climate, showing that the same climate had plants having common characteristics. From 1810 he also served as professor of botany at the Friedrich Wilhelm University. He visited Paris in 1810 but returned due to poor health in 1811. His herbarium, containing more than 20,000 species, is still preserved in the Botanical Garden in Berlin. A few specimens are in St. Petersburg. Some of the specimens include those collected by Humboldt.

Humboldt notes that as a young man, he was unable to identify plants using Willdenow's Flora Berolinensis which was published from 1803 to 1812. In it he had described nearly 80 species, with hand-coloured copper engravings of plants. In 1804 Willdenow wrote a self-study textbook of botany. Humboldt visited Willdenow, often without an appointment and found him to be a kindred soul only four years older and in three weeks he became an enthusiastic botanist.

In his 1792 book, Grundriss der Kräuterkunde or Geschichte der Pflanzen Willdenow came up with an idea to explain restricted plant distributions. Willdenow suggested that it was based on past history with mountains surrounded by seas with different sets of plants initially restricted to the peaks which then spread downward and out with receding sea levels. This would fit with the Biblical notion of floods. This was contrary to earlier assertions by Eberhard August Wilhelm von Zimmermann that plants were distributed as they had been in the past and that there had been no changes.

The botanists Ernst Ludwig Heim and Diederich Friedrich Carl von Schlechtendal were present at Willdenow's deathbed. He was buried in the Dorotheenstadt churchyard but his tombstone was removed in 1965 to the botanical garden in Berlin Dahlem as the churchyard was levelled. Willdenow was succeeded as director of the botanical gardens by Johann Christoph Andreas Mayer. The genus Willdenowia was named after him. A street in Berlin-Wedding and a street in Berlin-Lichterfelde are named after him as Willdenowstraße.

== Works ==
- Florae Berolinensis prodromus (1787)
- Grundriß der Kräuterkunde (1792) - English translation
- Linnaei species plantarum (1798–1826, 6 volumes) Botanicus
- Anleitung zum Selbststudium der Botanik (1804)
- Historia Amaranthorum (1790)
- Phytographia (1794)
- Enumeratio plantarum horti regii botanici Berolinensis (1809)
- Berlinische Baumzucht (1811)
- Abbildung der deutschen Holzarten für Forstmänner und Liebhaber der Botanik (1815-1820, Band 1-2) Digital edition by the University and State Library Düsseldorf
- Hortus Berolinensis (1816)

== See also ==
- Willdenowia (plant), in the family Restionaceae
- Selaginella willdenowii, Willdenow's spikemoss
- Willdenowia (journal), Annals of the Botanic Garden and Botanical Museum Berlin, named to honour Willdenow
