= Hypodiscus =

Scientific classification
- Kingdom: Plantae
- Clade: Tracheophytes
- Clade: Angiosperms
- Clade: Monocots
- Clade: Commelinids
- Order: Poales
- Family: Restionaceae
- Genus: Hypodiscus; Nees

Type species
- Hypodiscus aristatus (Thunb.) C.Krauss.

Synonyms
- Boeckhia Kunth; Lepidanthus Nees 1830 not Nutt. 1837 (syn of Phyllanthopsis in Phyllanthaceae) nor Nutt. 1841 (syn of Matricaria in Asteraceae); Leucoploeus Nees

Genus of flowering plants

Hypodiscus is a group of plants in the Restionaceae named by Christian Gottfried Daniel Nees von Esenbeck and described as a genus in 1836.

The entire genus is endemic to the Cape Provinces of South Africa.

== Species ==
15 species are accepted.

- Hypodiscus alboaristatus (Nees) Mast.
- Hypodiscus alternans Pillans
- Hypodiscus argenteus (Thunb.) Mast.
- Hypodiscus aristatus (Thunb.) C.Krauss
- Hypodiscus laevigatus (Kunth) H.P.Linder
- Hypodiscus montanus Esterh.
- Hypodiscus neesii Mast.
- Hypodiscus procurrens Esterh.
- Hypodiscus rigidus Mast.
- Hypodiscus rugosus Mast.
- Hypodiscus squamosus Esterh.
- Hypodiscus striatus (Kunth) Mast.
- Hypodiscus sulcatus Pillans
- Hypodiscus synchroolepis (Steud.) Mast.
- Hypodiscus willdenowia (Nees) Mast.

Formerly included

species included at one time in Hypodiscus but now in other genera (Cannomois and Willdenowia)

- Hypodiscus dodii - Willdenowia humilis
- Hypodiscus nitidus - Cannomois nitida
