= Admiral Island =

Admiral Island may refer to:

- Admiral Island (South Africa) 32°47′20.2″S 18°8′56.9″E
- Admiral Island (Western Australia) 16°04′00″S 123°24′06″E
