= Admiral Island (South Africa) =

Manmade island and residential estate

Coordinates: 32°47′20.2″S 18°8′56.9″E

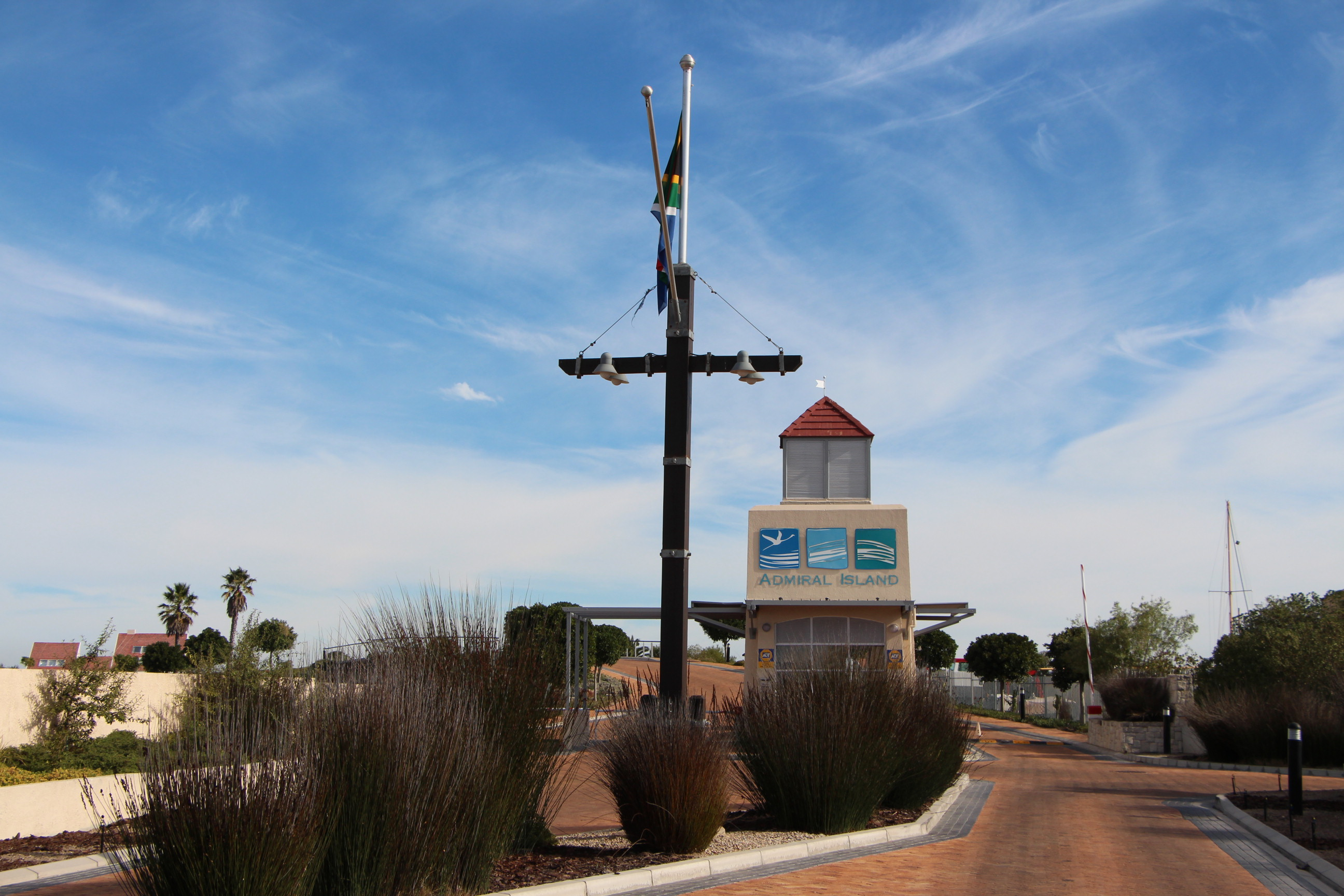
The entrance to Admiral Island.

Admiral Island is a manmade island and residential estate situated in Port Owen, which lies between the towns of Laaiplek and Velddrift on the West Coast region of South Africa. The area of the island is about 21 hectares, with a circumference of 3 km. The island is bounded on two sides by 2 km of private waterways and one side faces the Berg River. Admiral Island is a residential development with no commercial zones. Of the 191 plots on the island about two thirds are water-front stands.

== History ==
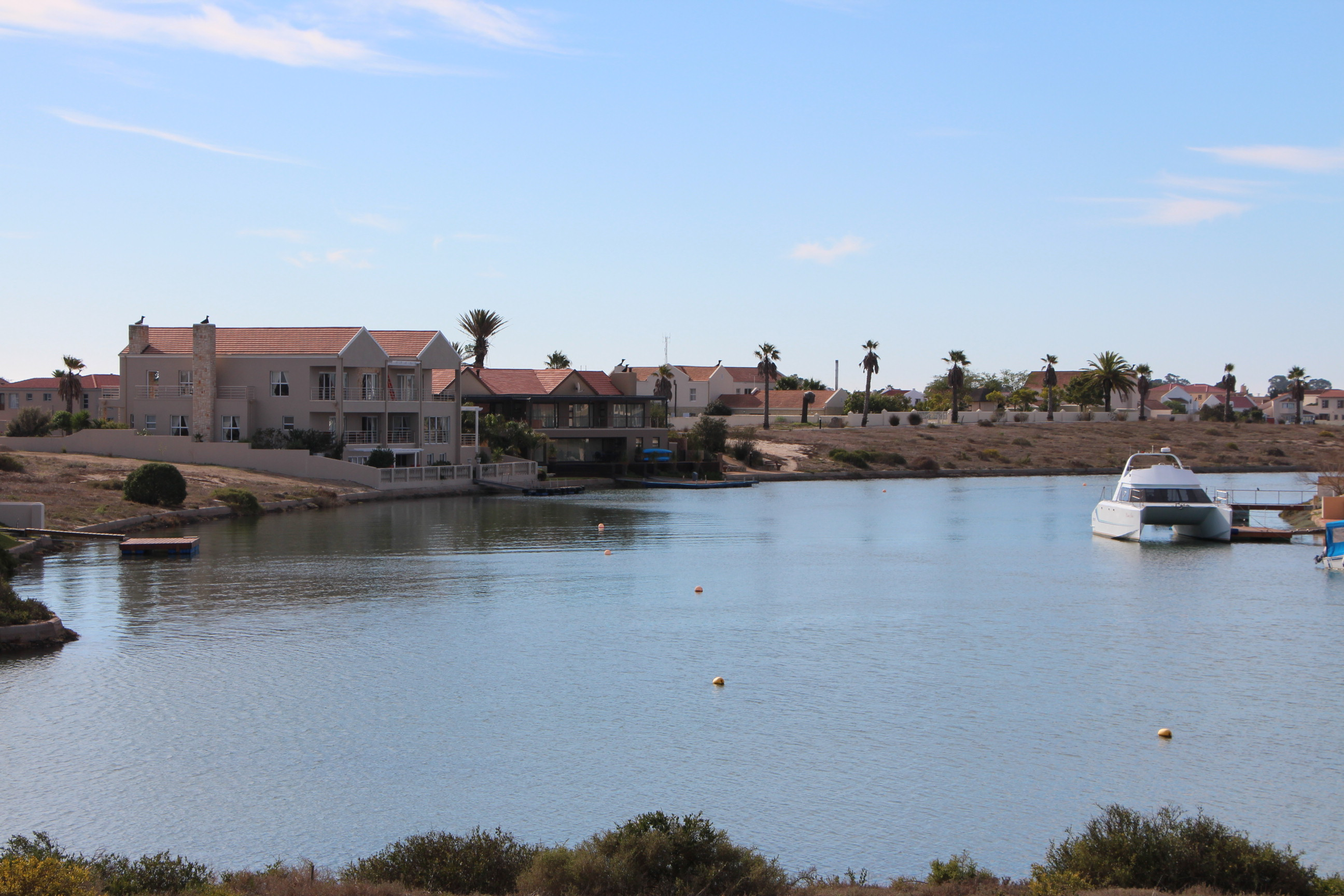
Typical house on Admiral Island.

The island was part of the original development of Port Owen. In 1999, the island was bought by a Belgium Consortium from the Owen Wiggins Trust Co. Ltd. and renamed Ile Plaisance. During 2004, the Belgium Consortium sold Ile Plaisance to a Group of Developers and it was renamed Admiral Island.
