= Willdenowia =

Willdenowia may refer to:

- Willdenowia (journal), a botanical journal
- Willdenowia (plant), a genus of plants
