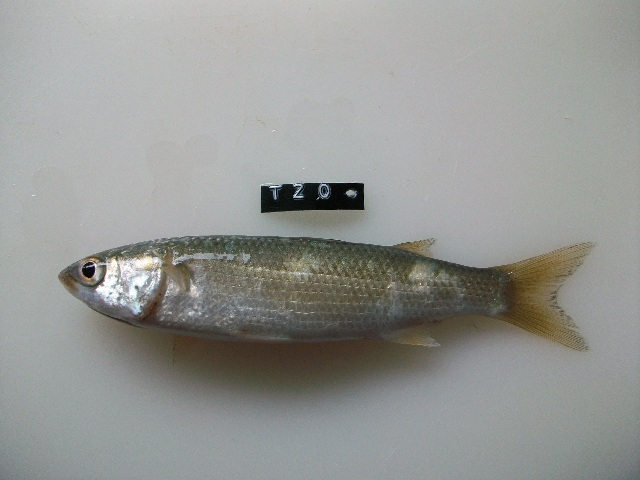

Scientific classification
- Kingdom: Animalia
- Phylum: Chordata
- Class: Actinopterygii
- Order: Mugiliformes
- Family: Mugilidae
- Genus: Chelon
- Species: C. richardsonii

Binomial name
- Chelon richardsonii (A. Smith, 1846)

Synonyms
- Mugil richardsonii A. Smith, 1846; Liza richardsonii (A. Smith, 1846); Mugil multilineatus A. Smith, 1846

= South African mullet =

Species of ray-finned fish

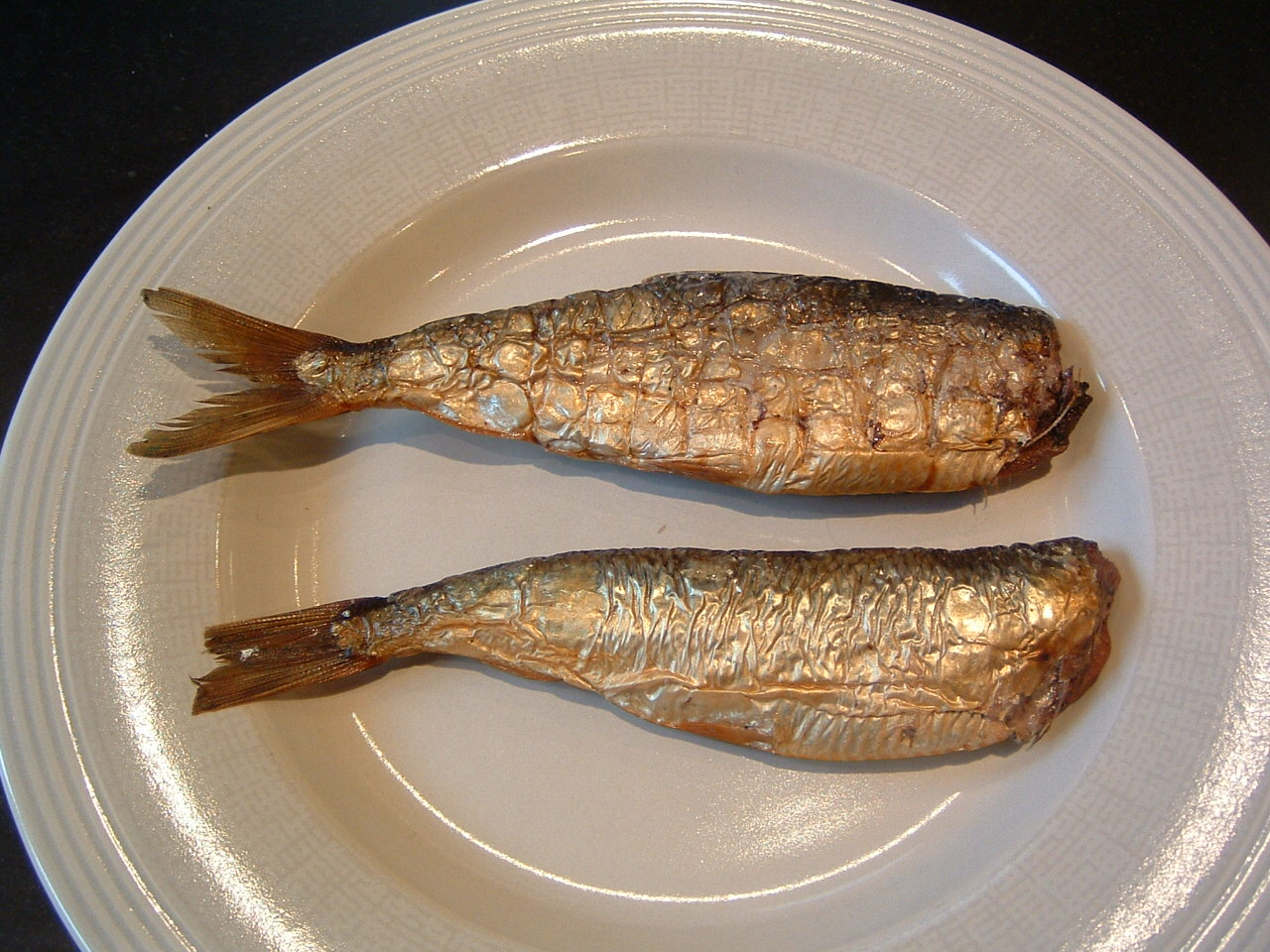
Smoked mullet or harder

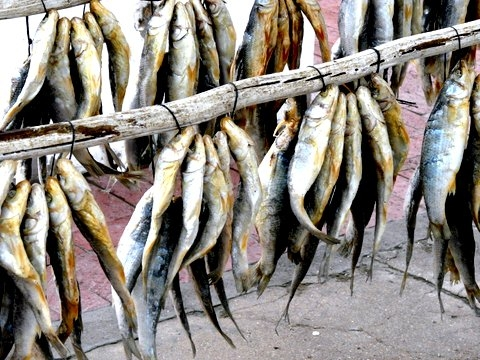
Hanging bokkoms: whole, salted and dried mullet (Paternoster, Western Cape)

The South African mullet (Chelon richardsonii), also called a harder mullet or simply harder, is a species of mullet. It is found in South African coastal waters from Walvis Bay (Namibia) to KwaZulu-Natal, and grows to a maximum length of 40.5 cm (15.9 in). The person the specific name honours was not recorded by Andrew Smith when he described this species but it is most likely to be John Richardson (1787-1865), the Scottish naturalist, surgeon and Arctic explorer.

It is also found inland in the waters of the Olifants River (Western Cape).

== Culinary use ==
Mullet caught in the sea and estuaries of the West Coast region are processed by salting and air-drying into bokkoms by small local factories around Velddrif and Laaiplek.

== See also ==
- The common name "harder mullet" in Germany refers to the flathead mullet, Mugil cephalus.
- USS Harder (SS-257), a World War II-era submarine named after the fish
