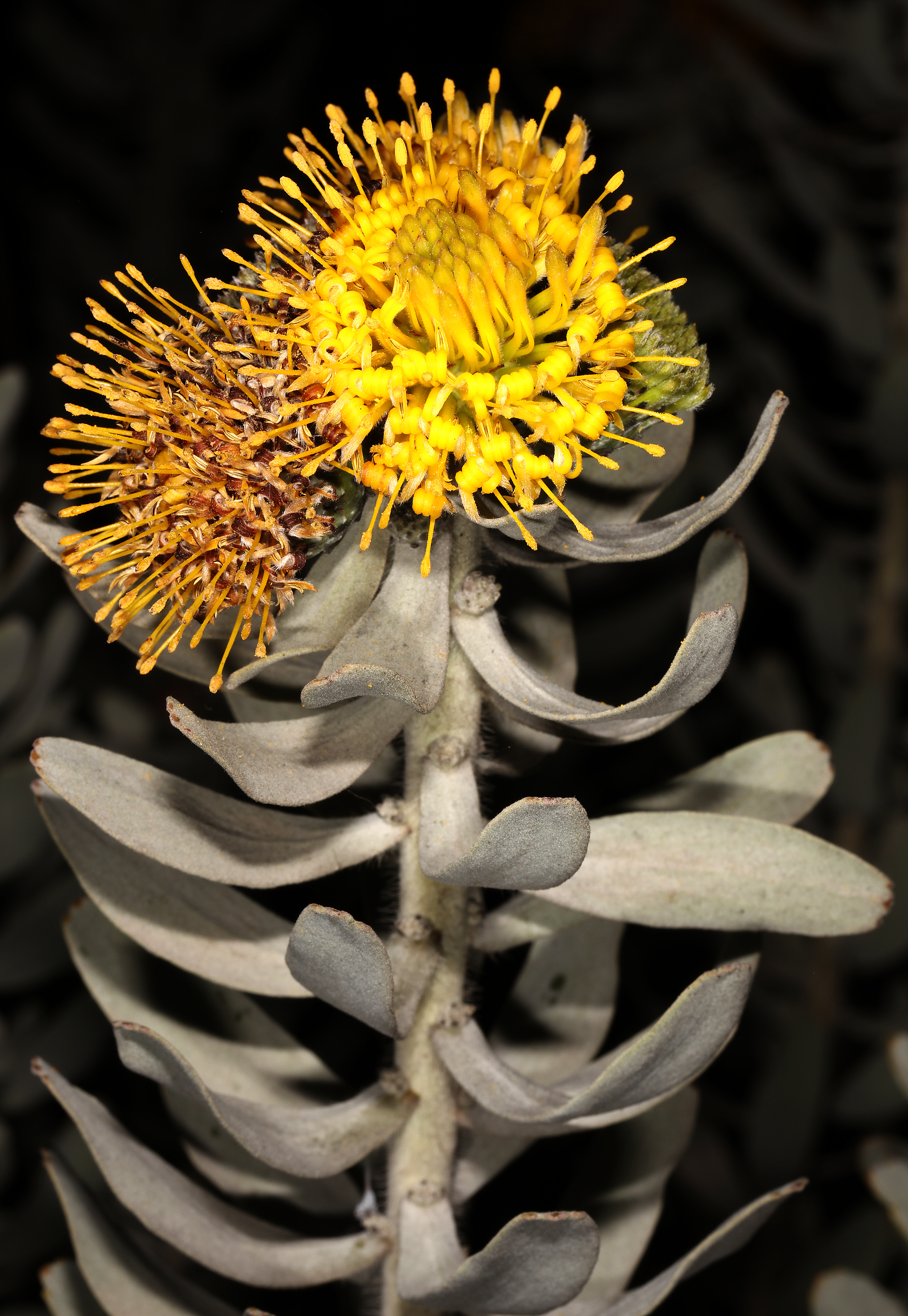

Conservation status
- Near Threatened (IUCN 3.1)

Scientific classification
- Kingdom: Plantae
- Clade: Tracheophytes
- Clade: Angiosperms
- Clade: Eudicots
- Order: Proteales
- Family: Proteaceae
- Genus: Leucospermum
- Species: L. rodolentum

Binomial name
- Leucospermum rodolentum Rourke, 1970

Synonyms
- Leucadendrum rodolentum; Protea candicans Andr. 1803, non Thunb. 1800 = Paranomus candicans, Leucospermum candidans

= Leucospermum rodolentum =

Evergreen shrub

Leucospermum rodolentum is an upright, evergreen shrub of up to 3.0 m high, from the family Proteaceae. It has felty grey, elliptic to wedge-shaped leaves of 4–6½ cm (1.8–2.6 in) long and ¾–1½ cm wide, and very sweetly scented, globe-shaped, 3–3½ cm (1.2–1.4 in) wide, bright yellow flower heads, that are seated or on a very short stalk of ½ cm long, grouped with two to four together. Its common names include is sandveld pincushion in English and sandluisie or sandveldluisiesbos in Afrikaans. The plants are in bloom between August and November. It is an endemic species that only grows in a small area of the Western Cape province of South-Africa.

== Description ==
Leucospermum rodolentum is an upright spreading shrub of up to 3 m (10 ft) high and 4 m (13½ ft) in diameter, that develops from a single trunk at its base of 8–14 cm (3¼–4¾ in) thick, with a smooth, grey bark. The flowering stems are rising up 5–7 mm in diameter and grey due to a dense layer of grey fine crisped hairs. The leaves are elliptic to wedge-shaped, 4–6½ cm (1.8–2.6 in) long and ¾–1½ cm (0.3-0.6 in) wide, with a blunt or tapering base, a rounded or bitten-off tip with three to six teeth, and a grey surface due to a dense layer of fine, short, crisped hairs.

The flower heads are globe-shaped, 3–3½ cm (1.2–1.4 in) across, seated or with a short stalk of up to ½ cm (0.2 in) long, occurring in groups of two, three or four, rarely individually. The common base of the flowers in the same head is flattened cone-shaped, about 1 cm (0.4 in) long and ¾ cm (0.3 in) across. The greyish bracts that subtend the head are oval with a pointy tip, 5−7 mm (0.20–0.28 in) long and 2–3 mm (0.08–0.12 in) wide, tightly overlapping, cartilaginous in consistency.

The carmine bract that subtends each flower individually is narrowly lance-shaped with a pointy tip, about 2 cm (0.8 in) long and 2 mm (0.08 in) wide, embraces the base of the perianth, is thickly woolly at its foot, powdery hairy near the tip, and is fringed by equally long hairs. The straight, deep yellow, 4-merous perianth is straight and cylinder-shaped in bud, and 1½–2½ cm (0.6–1.0 in) long. The lowest, fully merged, part of the perianth, called tube is cylinder-shaped, about 5 mm long, hairless, and hyaline in consistency. The middle part (or claws), where the perianth is split lengthwise is curled back in the upper half. While the claw facing the edge of the head is thinly silky hairy, the remaining three claws quickly loose any hair that might be there in the bud. The upper part (or limbs), which enclosed the pollen presenter in the bud, consists of four lance-shaped with a pointy tip, are still tinged with green in bud, are about 3 mm (0.12 in) long and 1 mm (0.04 in) wide, and carries very few silky hairs. From the perianth emerges a straight style of 1½–2½ cm (0.6–1.0 in), that tapers near the tip, sometimes curves slightly away from the center of the head. The thickened part at the tip of the style called pollen presenter is hoof-shaped to bluntly cylinder-shaped, about 2 mm (0.08 in) long, with a groove that functions as the stigma across the very tip. The ovary is subtended by four opaque, awl-shaped scales of about 1 mm long.

=== Differences with related species ===
L. rodolentum can be distinguished from other species by its tall, up to 3.0 m high, upright habit and its grey felty elliptic to wedge-shaped leaves of ¾–1½ cm wide. It can be distinguished from L. parile, which has red pointed bracts.

== Taxonomy ==
The sandveld pincushion was first described by Henry Cranke Andrews in 1803. He had based his description on the living flowering plants, that he had studied in George Hibbert's conservatory at Clapham, London in 1802. These had probably been grown from seeds, that had been collected by Francis Masson. However, the name Protea candicans had already been used by Carl Thunberg in 1800 for the plant that is now called Paranomus candicans. In 1809, Richard Anthony Salisbury proposed the name Leucadendrum rodolentum in a book published by Joseph Knight titled On the cultivation of the plants belonging to the natural order of Proteeae, that contained an extensive revision of the Proteaceae attributed to Salisbury. In 1818 Robert Sweet combined Andrew's species name with the genus name that Robert Brown had proposed to Leucospermum candicans, which is invalid because Andrew's epithet was not available. John Patrick Rourke made the correct combination Leucospermum rodolentum In 1969.

L. rodolentum has been assigned to the section Leucospermum.

The species name rodolentum means ″smelling like roses″.

== Distribution, habitat and ecology ==
The sandveld pincushion can naturally be found from Darling in the south, through the Hopefield, Piketberg, and Clanwilliam districts, to the Heerenlogementberg and the Nardouw Pass. An isolated population can be found south of the Brandvlei Dam. Isolated populations near Kraaifontein (1960s) and Salt River (19th century), now a Cape Town suburb, have gone extinct due to urban expansion. The species is a prominent constituent of sandveld vegetation that grows on the sandy flats of the west of the Western Cape province, between sealevel and 250 m (800 ft) or rarely 300 m (1000 ft) altitude, often together with Leucadendron pubescens and several large, tufted Restionaceae, such as Willdenowia. It occurs only in loose, very often stabilised Tertiary or Quaternary drift sands. The average annual precipitation in this area is 380–500 mm (15–20 in), mainly falling during the winter half year.

The species is pollinated by insects, such as honey bees, monkey beetle), skippers, and also visited by birds like the Cape sugarbird, orange-breasted sunbird, and Cape weaver. The ripe fruits fall to the ground about two months after flowering, where these are collected by native ants, that carry them to their nests. Here, they remain underground, safe from fires, seed-eating rodents and birds, until an overhead fire clears the vegetation and triggers the seeds to germinate.

== Conservation ==
The sandveld pincushion is considered a vulnerable species because its population has decreased by at least 30% in the last 60 years, due to habitat loss through agricultural expansion and groundwater extraction.
