= Bokkoms =

Whole, salted and dried mullet

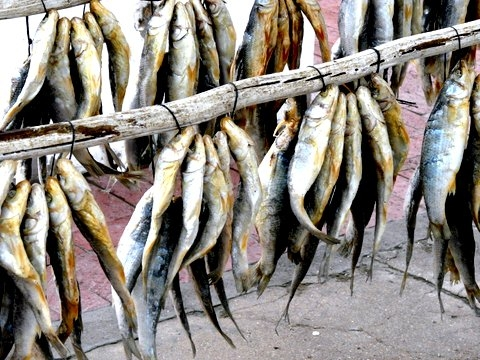
- Bokkoms
- Place of origin: South Africa

Bokkoms (or bokkems) is whole, salted and dried mullet (more specifically the Southern mullet, Chelon richardsonii, a type of fish commonly known in the Western Cape of South Africa as "harders"), and is a well-known specialty of the West Coast region of South Africa. This salted fish is dried in the sun and wind and is eaten after peeling off the skin. In some cases it is also smoked. It is sometimes referred to as "fish biltong".

== Origins of the word ==
The word bokkom comes from the Dutch word bokkem, which is a variant of the word bokking (or buckinc in Middle Dutch). The word bokking is derived from the word bok (the Dutch word for buck or goat) and refers to the fact that bokkoms reminds of goat, because bokkoms has the same shape as the horns of a goat, is just as hard as a goat's horns, and stinks just as much as the horn of a goat (goats have scent glands behind their horns that cause the smell). The first official record of the use of the word in the Afrikaans language of South Africa was in the Patriotwoordeboek in 1902 in the form bokkom.

== History ==
As early as 1658, only six years after the first permanent settlement of Europeans at the Cape of Good Hope, four free burghers were given permission to settle in Saldanha Bay on the West Coast of Southern Africa. They were given the right from the Dutch East India Company to fish the waters of Saldanha Bay and send their catches to the company's trading post at the Cape of Good Hope, to be sold to other burghers as well as to passing ships in Table Bay. They had sole rights to the lucrative fishing until 1711. One fifth of the catch had to be delivered in salted and dried form, which was the origins of bokkoms in South Africa.

== Preparation ==
The ingredients for bokkoms consist of small (juvenile) mullet, coarse salt and fresh water. The original West Coast way of preparing bokkoms starts with catching the juvenile mullet (called "harders" in Afrikaans). A large square tank built out of bricks or stone is filled with a strong pickle made of around 50 kg of coarse salt and fresh water, to which the fish is added. As soon as enough fish is added to reach the top of the tank, two or three spades full of dry coarse salt is spread on top of the fish. Thereafter more layers of fish and salt are put on top until all the fish is covered in salt. A thick layer of salt is added to the top. This is left for one day. On the second day, a press made with wood with weights on top is placed on the fish in the tank, to ensure that the guts of the fish are pressed flat for preservation. After the third day in the tank, the fish is taken out and is then strung up in bunches of 10 to 25 fish each on a rope, making use of a fish needle which is pushed through the eyes of the fish. The bunches are then dipped two to three times in fresh water before they are hung on scaffolds to dry.

=== Drying ===
The most suitable circumstances for drying is a lot of wind and not too harsh sunlight. At nighttime, the fish is brought under a roof to prevent it from drawing in damp, and the next day it is taken outside again to hang in the sun. The whole drying process takes about 5 days. More recently, people have started to make use of drying "ovens". This consists of a closed room with an electrical fan, in which the fish is hung. The fan blows heated air into the room. This simplifies the drying process considerably, since the fish does not need to be moved indoors every evening. This also allows drying to take place during the wetter winter months.

== Bokkom industry ==
Bokkoms is a specialty typical of the Western Cape of South Africa, and specifically the West Coast. Although it has a significant market in the Western Cape (where it is well-known and can be found in hotels, bars, bottle stores, fish shops and beach kiosks on the beaches and holiday resorts), it has not become a common product in the larger part of Southern African butcheries, fisheries and grocery stores like biltong. It is, however, available for ordering and shipping through the internet in vacuum-packed format.

There is a vibrant bokkom industry in the "bokkom capital" of the world, Velddrif, on the West Coast of South Africa. Around 95% of South Africa's bokkoms are produced in Velddrif, in a series of small individual factories located along the Berg River. Each factory has its own small jetty on the river at the front of the factory. In the past, large schools of mullet were caught in the river and the jetties were used as a place to tie the fishermen's "bakkies" (small boats) to unload their catch. Because of over-fishing, the catching of mullet in the river is now prohibited and it must be netted in the open sea just off Laaiplek.

Velddrif is the ideal place for the bokkom industry. It has access to the mullet just off the coast, its weather conditions are ideal for drying the fish (dry summers and relatively low rainfall), and it has access to large amounts of sea salt as spring tide pushes the sea over the extensive salt pans (the largest salt factory in South Africa where salt is extracted from sea water, the Cerebos salt factory, is also situated there). It also has access to fresh water in the form of the Berg. The well-known Bokkomlaan ('bokkom avenue') along the banks of the Berg in Velddrif is a place where tourists can see large numbers of bokkoms strung up in bunches on rows of reed scaffolds along the side of the road.

== Eating ==
Bokkoms is often eaten with white wine, or with bread, apricot jam and black coffee, but can also be used in soups, spaghetti, tapenade, ragout or on its own.

== Environmental concerns ==
There has been concern raised over declining fish stocks on the West Coast of South Africa. The Southern mullet is on the WWF Southern African Sustainable Seafood Initiative (SASSI) Orange list as an unsustainable species. This group includes species that have associated reasons for concern, either because the species is depleted as a result of overfishing and cannot sustain current fishing pressure, or because the fishing or farming method poses harm to the environment and/or the biology of the species makes it vulnerable to high fishing pressure. These species may be legally sold by registered commercial fishers and retailers. However, an increased demand for these could compromise a sustainable supply.

== In popular culture ==
The word bokkoms has been taken up in the Afrikaans language in at least three proverbs:

1. To refer to a very boring, tiresome, dull person, i.e. "a dry old stick", in the phrase "'n droë bokkom" (literally translated "a dry bokkem").
2. To refer to someone who is incompetent, unable to perform his work adequately, not able to do the simplest of things, in the phrase "hy kan nie bokkom braai nie" (literally translated "he is not able to barbecue a bokkom").
3. To refer to someone who is very thin and emaciated, in the phrase "hy is pure bokkom en biltong, maar min vir die jakkalse" (literally translated "he is pure bokkom and biltong, not a lot for the jackals").

It has also been used as the name for a specific family of plants with sharp seedpods found in South Africa. These plants have been given the name of bokkoms in Afrikaans because the seedpods look like bokkoms, and their unpleasant smell reminds of the strong fish smell of bokkoms.

== Comparison to similar foodstuffs ==
Bokkoms are similar to dried herring, as well as bloaters, kippers and buckling. Bloaters (whole fish), kippers (split) and buckling (head and guts removed) are all lightly salted and smoked for a short period of time. Although the method for making bokkoms probably originated from the European method of making dried herring, bokkoms use a different species of fish (the mullet) and smoking is not regularly used in their preparation.

== See also ==
=== Similar foods ===
- Dried angelfish
- Dried snoek
- Shark biltong

=== Related topics ===
- List of dried foods
- List of smoked foods
