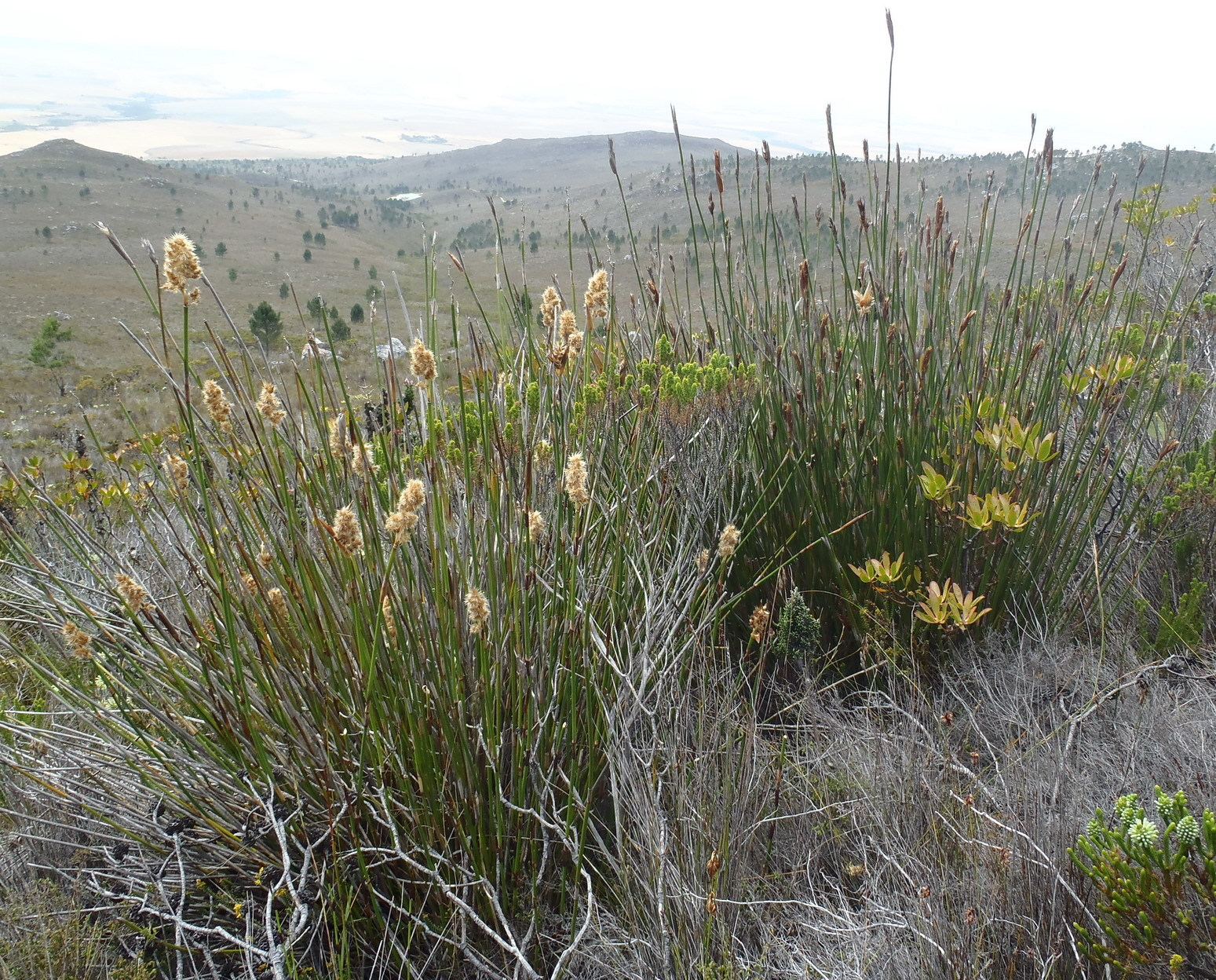

Scientific classification
- Kingdom: Plantae
- Clade: Tracheophytes
- Clade: Angiosperms
- Clade: Monocots
- Clade: Commelinids
- Order: Poales
- Family: Restionaceae
- Genus: Ceratocaryum
- Species: C. argenteum

Binomial name
- Ceratocaryum argenteum Nees ex Kunth
- Distribution of Ceratocaryum argenteum

Synonyms
- Ceratocaryum speciosum Nees ex Mast.; Restio argenteus Nees

= Ceratocaryum argenteum =

Silver arrowreed

Species of plant

Ceratocaryum argenteum, commonly known as silver arrowreed, is a species of plant in the Restionaceae family and is native to the Cape Provinces of South Africa.

== Description ==
The caespitose plants are 2–3 metres (79–118 in) tall and grow in coastal sands at elevations of 50–200 metres (160–660 ft) above sea level. They flower throughout April and May. The plants release their tuberculate nut fruits in January.

== Ecology ==
Ceratocaryum argenteum has an unusual seed dispersal strategy. It employs chemical compounds to deceive dung beetles, which treat the seeds as if they were true animal fecal matter. The beetles bury the seeds. This strategy of faecal mimicry is shared with another species, namely Ceratocaryum pulchrum. The seeds are not consumed or gathered by rodents. Their strategy of adaption to wildfires is to re-grow from seeds after such fires occur.

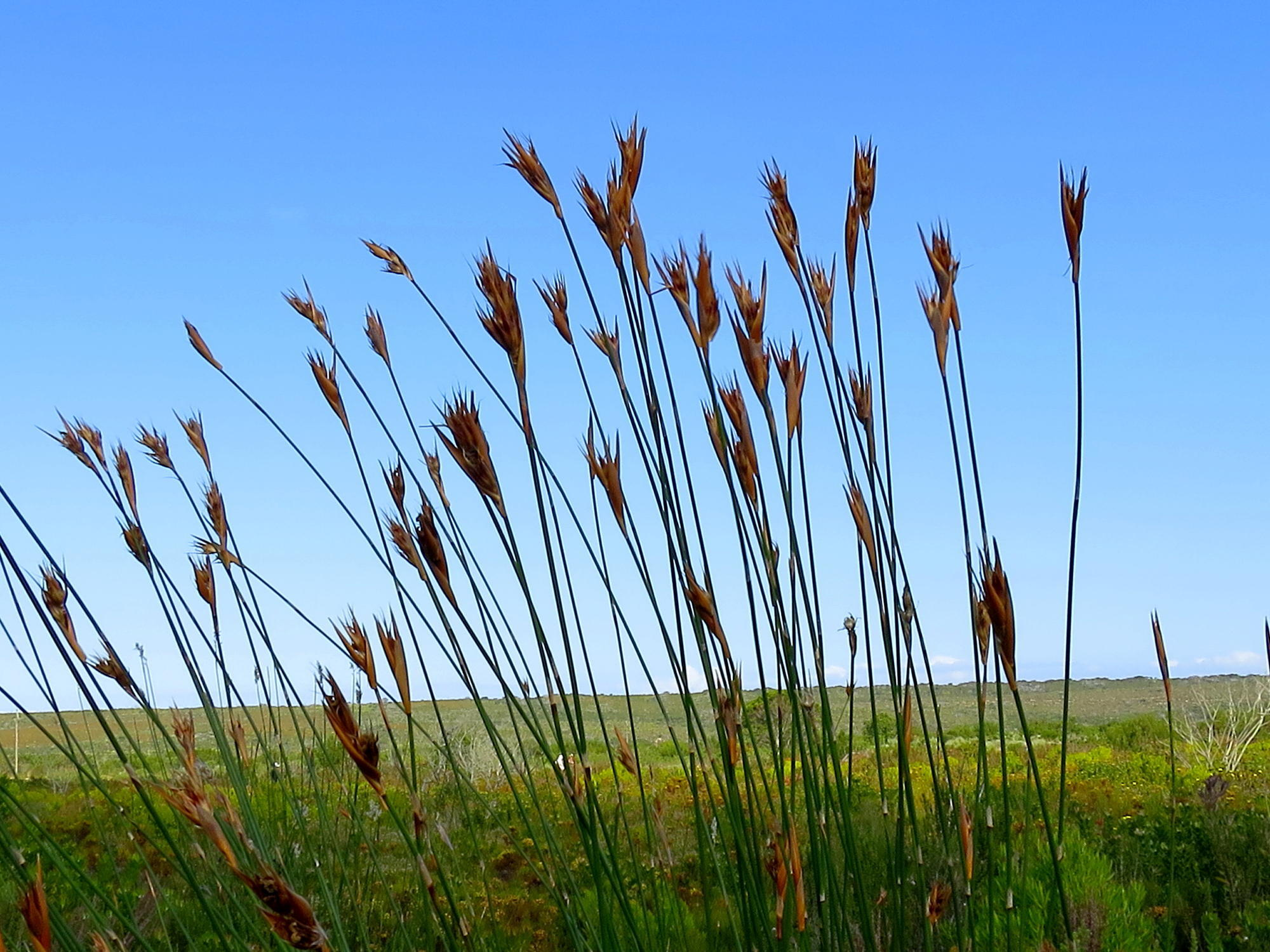
Ceratocaryum argenteum. The seeds resemble dung balls in great detail and deceive dung beetles. This is called mimicry.

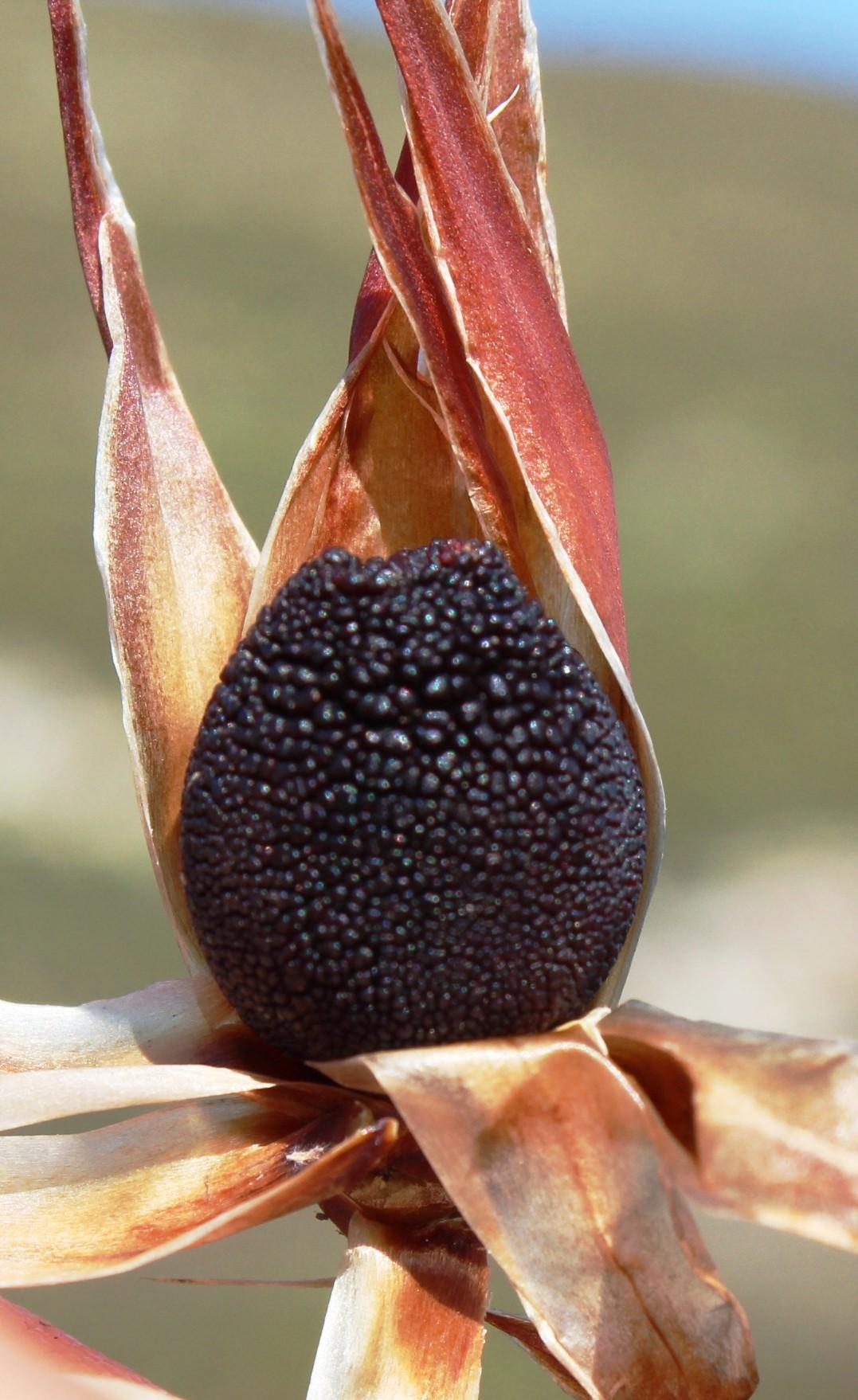
Seed

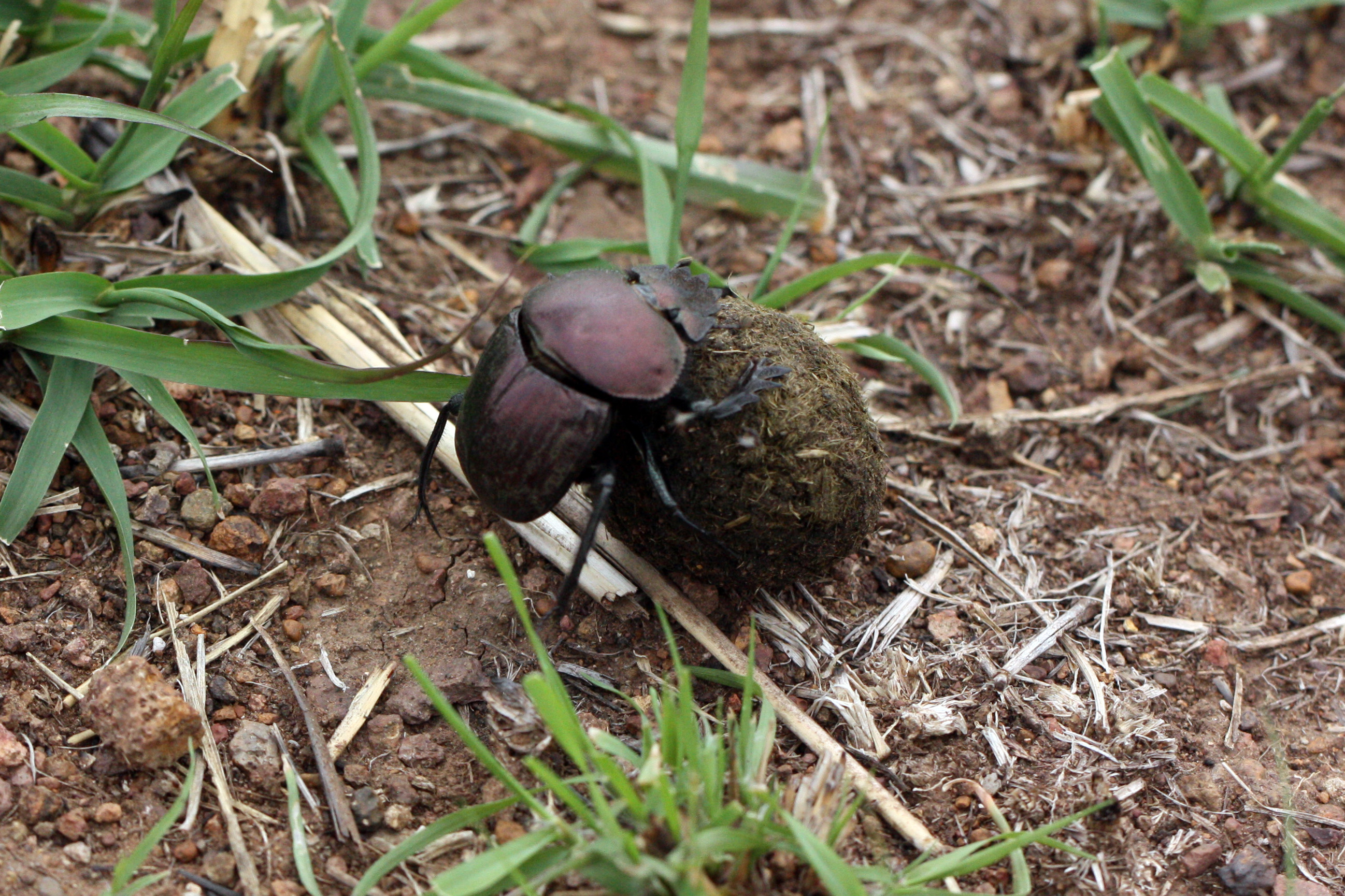
Dung beetle moving a ball of dung. In the same way, the beetles disperse and bury the seeds, ensuring ideal germination conditions of the plants.

== Distribution ==
This species is native to the southwestern Cape Provinces of South Africa, from Albertinia to Paarl.

== Taxonomy ==
It is the sister species of Ceratocaryum pulchrum.
