= Velddrif =

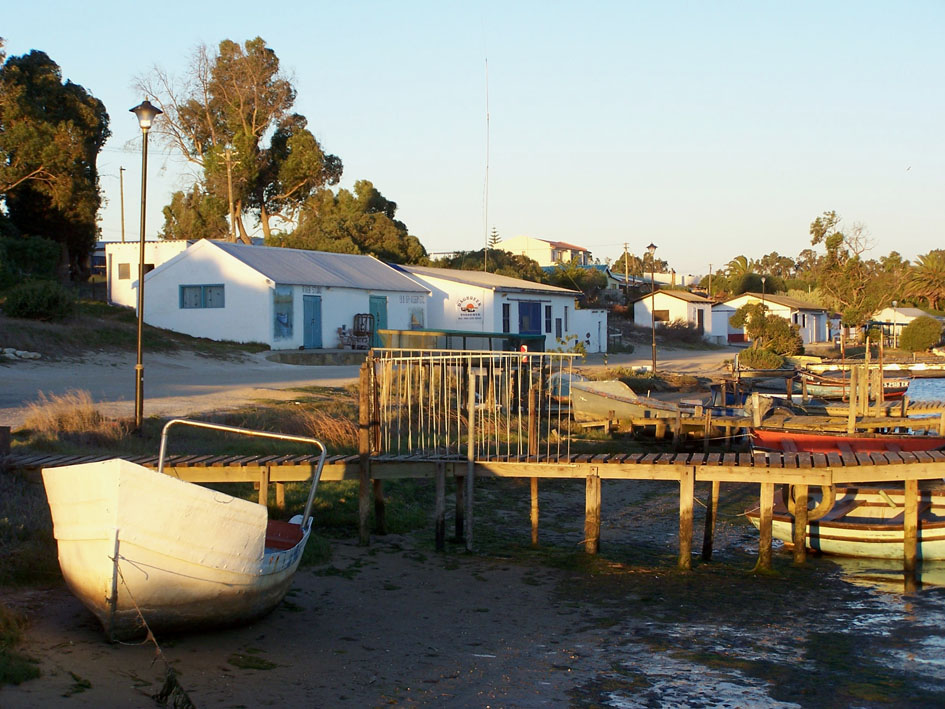
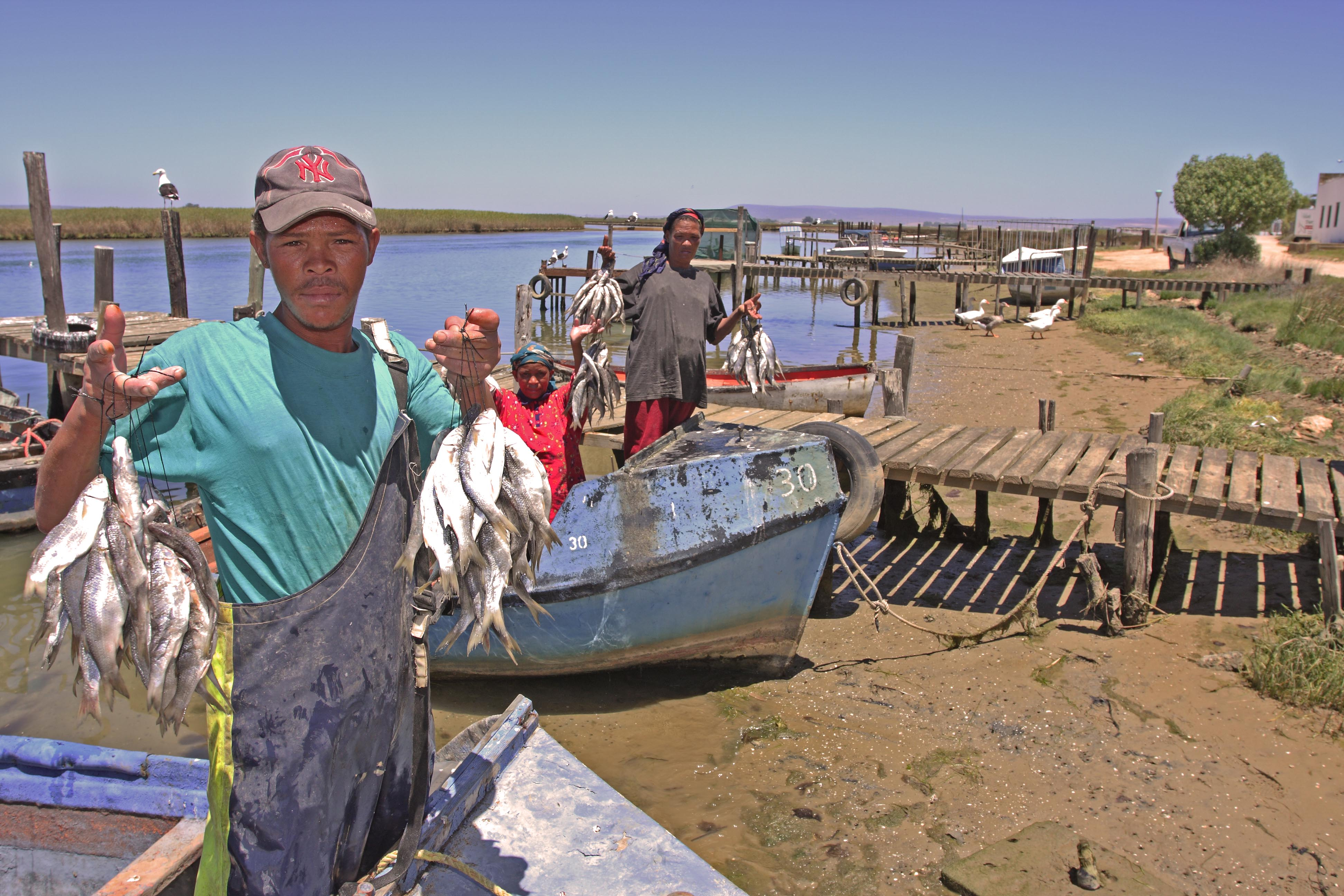
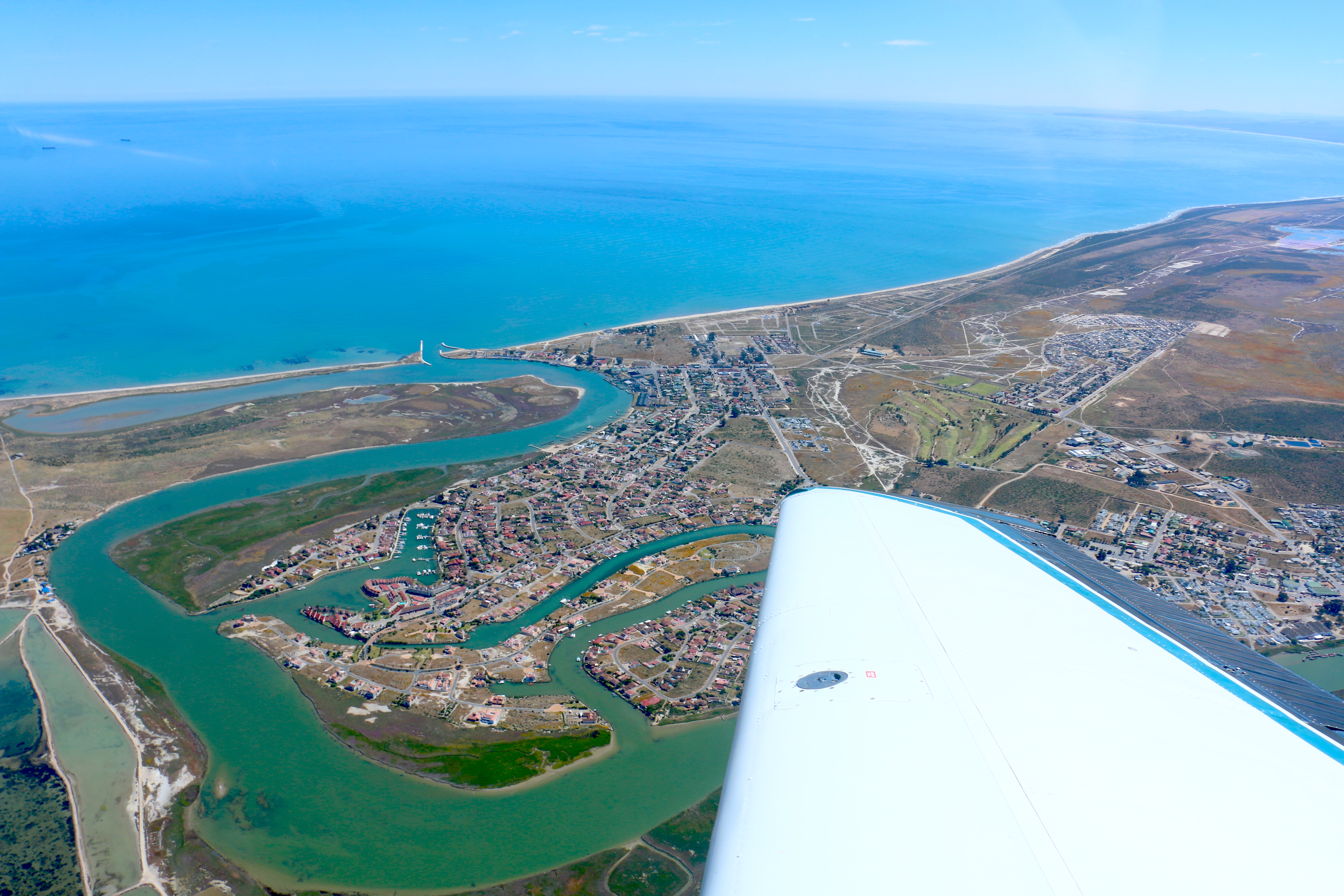
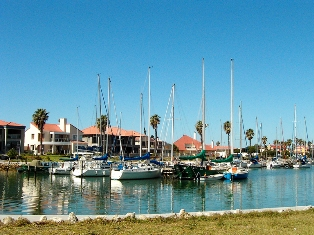
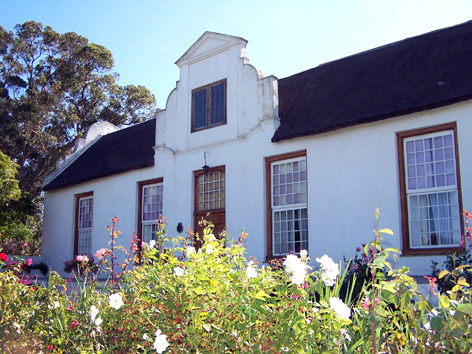
- From top, fishing piers on the Berg River. Left middle, a fisherman and his catch. Right middle, Bird's eye view of Velddirf. Below left, Port Owen at Velddrift. Below right, Farmhouse between Hopefield and Velddrif.

- Location within Western Cape Location within South Africa
- Coordinates: 32°47′S 18°10′E
- Country: South Africa
- Province: Western Cape
- District: West Coast
- Municipality: Bergrivier

Area
  - Total: 8.87 km^{2} (3.42 sq mi)

Population (2022)
  - Total: 17,043
  - Density: 1,920/km^{2} (4,980/sq mi)

Racial makeup (2011)
  - Black African: 12.2%
  - Coloured: 57.1%
  - Indian/Asian: 0.5%
  - White: 29.6%
  - Other: 0.6%

First languages (2011)
  - Afrikaans: 83.5%
  - Xhosa: 8.7%
  - English: 5.8%
  - Other: 2.1%
- Time zone: UTC+2 (SAST)
- Postal code (street): 7365
- PO box: 7365
- Area code: 022

Velddrif (the name of the town) or Velddrift (the name of the farm on which the town was established), is a coastal fishing town in the Bergrivier Local Municipality, Western Cape, South Africa. The town had a population 12507 in 2015 and is located on the estuary at which the Berg River flows into St. Helena Bay.

== Geography and environment ==
Velddrif is located approximately 145 kilometres (90 mi) north of Cape Town to which it is connected by the R27 road. The R27 joins the R399 at Velddrif, which is near the point at which the meandering Berg River flows into the sea at St. Helena Bay. The estuary is an important bird habitat and is home to around 30,000 birds, including up to 80 species which are endemic to the Cape coast. Well over 350 different species of birds can be seen here, as it is a habitat for sea, river and land birds.

Flowers grow in this area, including the Euclea racemosa (Kersbos), Babiana ringens (Rotstert), Willdenowia incurvata (Sonkwas Riet), Limonium (Strandroos) and Leucospermum rodolentum (Sandveld Luisebos). Regular boat trips can be taken up the river for birdwatching.

== History ==
The name Velddrif is derived from a drift in the field (Afrikaans: veld) through which a local farmer, Theunis Smit, took his stock to access grazing across the Berg River. In 1899, a pont (pontoon ferry) was built to cross the Berg River.

== Economy ==
The main industries of Velddrif are fishing, tourism and salt production. There are two large salt works in the town that provide much of the salt in the Western Cape. The fishing industry is substantial in Velddrif; the town is part of the Crayfish Route. A common sight in the area are the rickety wooden jetties on which the dried fish speciality, bokkoms, is hung out to dry. The town contains Port Owen, which comprises 100 hectares and has 3.5 km of waterways.

The town attracts a number of tourists, especially for its wildlife, fishing, yachting and art galleries, which represents the work of over 100 artists and craftsmen in the area. Birdwatching is a significant component of the town's tourism sector, as the Berg River Estuary, next to the town, is famous as a rare bird hotspot with over 200 species found in the 24,000 ha wetland.

There are numerous restaurants in Velddrif and nearby Laaiplek(which is a neighbourhood of Velddrif) that serve fresh fish and other seafood. A holiday resort has grown up around the marina area of Port Owen and Admiral Island Security Village. The annual Berg River Canoe Marathon starts in Paarl and ends at the Carinus Bridge Velddrif. The first Berg River Canoe Marathon was held in 1962, has gained a reputation for being one of the toughest courses in the world and is the longest course in South Africa. Ayesha Abdool Aziz, who hails from Edgemead Primary, holds the current record for the group aged under 9.

== Education ==
Hoërskool Velddrif [Velddrif High School] is a public high school in Velddrif, Western Cape, South Africa. It is an Afrikaans combined upper and lower secondary school with approximately 500 students.

Hoërskool Velddrif was founded in 1890 as a private school.

List of school principals

Years	Name
1890–1893	Daniël Orffer
1894–1925	P.J. Geldenhuys
1925–1926	I.J. Smit
1927–1931	A.P. Viljoen
1932–1936	C.J. Potgieter
1936–1943	J.H. Burger
1944–1966	P.J. Louw
1967–1982	G. Nieuwoudt
1982–1996	D.J.E. Smit
1996–2012	D.J.A. Brand
2013–2022	A. van der Westhuizen
2022-	L. van Rensburg (Acting)

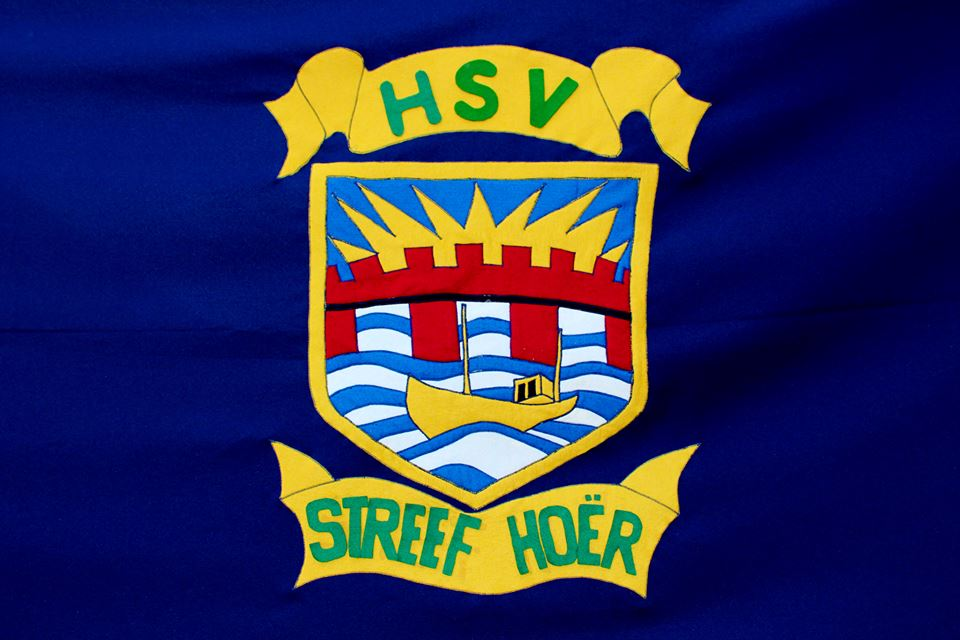
Hoërskool Velddrif

The school crest represents the environs of Velddrif. Five wavy white lanes represent water, namely the Berg River and the sea. The boat is a stylized version of a fishing boat, honoring Velddrif's fishing industry, on which the town's economy was largely built. The bridge indicates the bridge between youth and adulthood. The sun relates to the schools motto: "Strive Higher."
