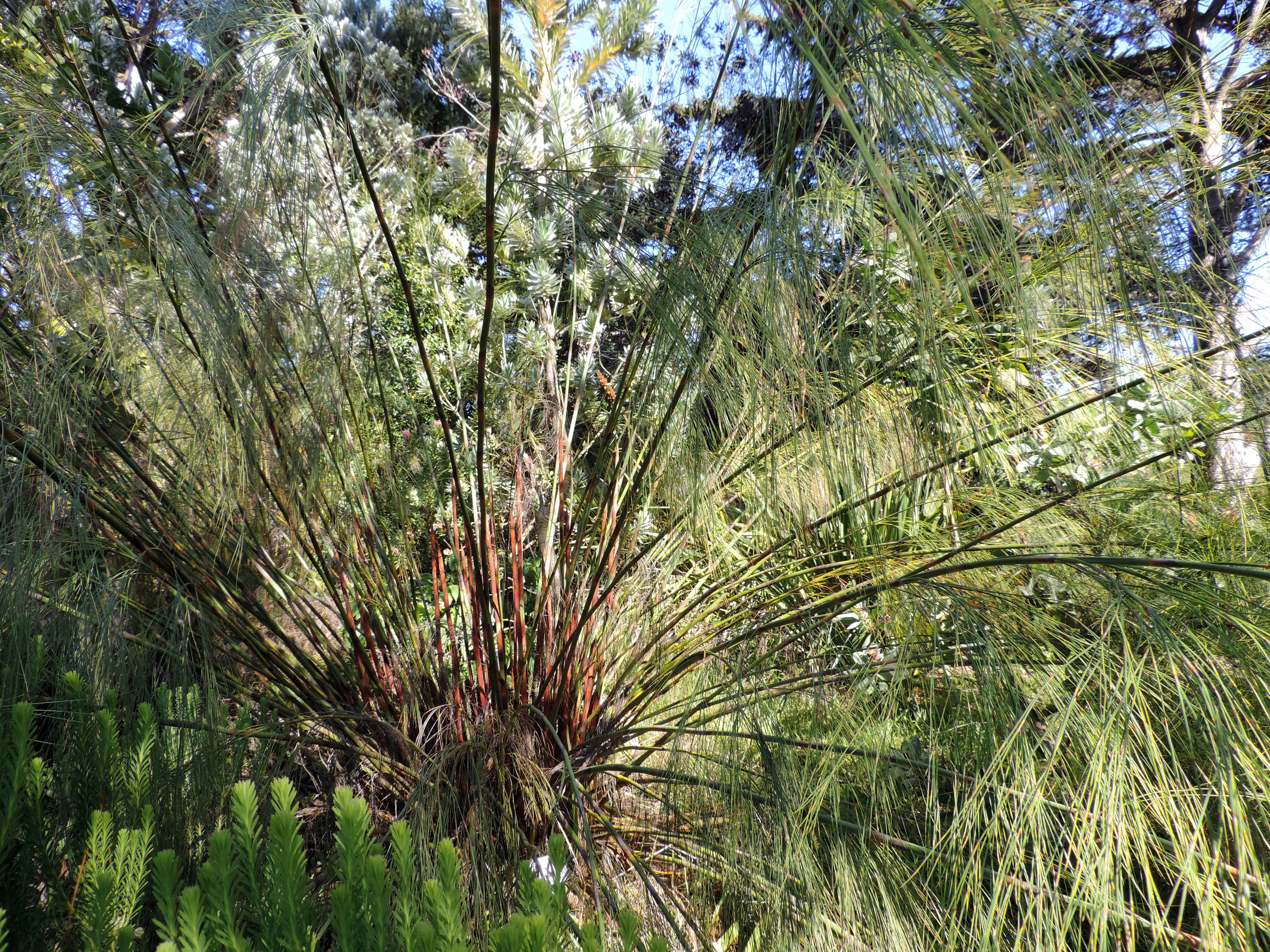

Scientific classification
- Kingdom: Plantae
- Clade: Embryophytes
- Clade: Tracheophytes
- Clade: Angiosperms
- Clade: Monocots
- Clade: Commelinids
- Order: Poales
- Family: Restionaceae
- Genus: Cannomois
- Species: C. grandis

Binomial name
- Cannomois grandis H.P.Linder

= Cannomois grandis =

Species of flowering plant

Cannomois grandis is a species of rush-like flowering plant in the genus Cannomois, native to the Cape Provinces of South Africa. It has gained the Royal Horticultural Society's Award of Garden Merit as an ornamental.
