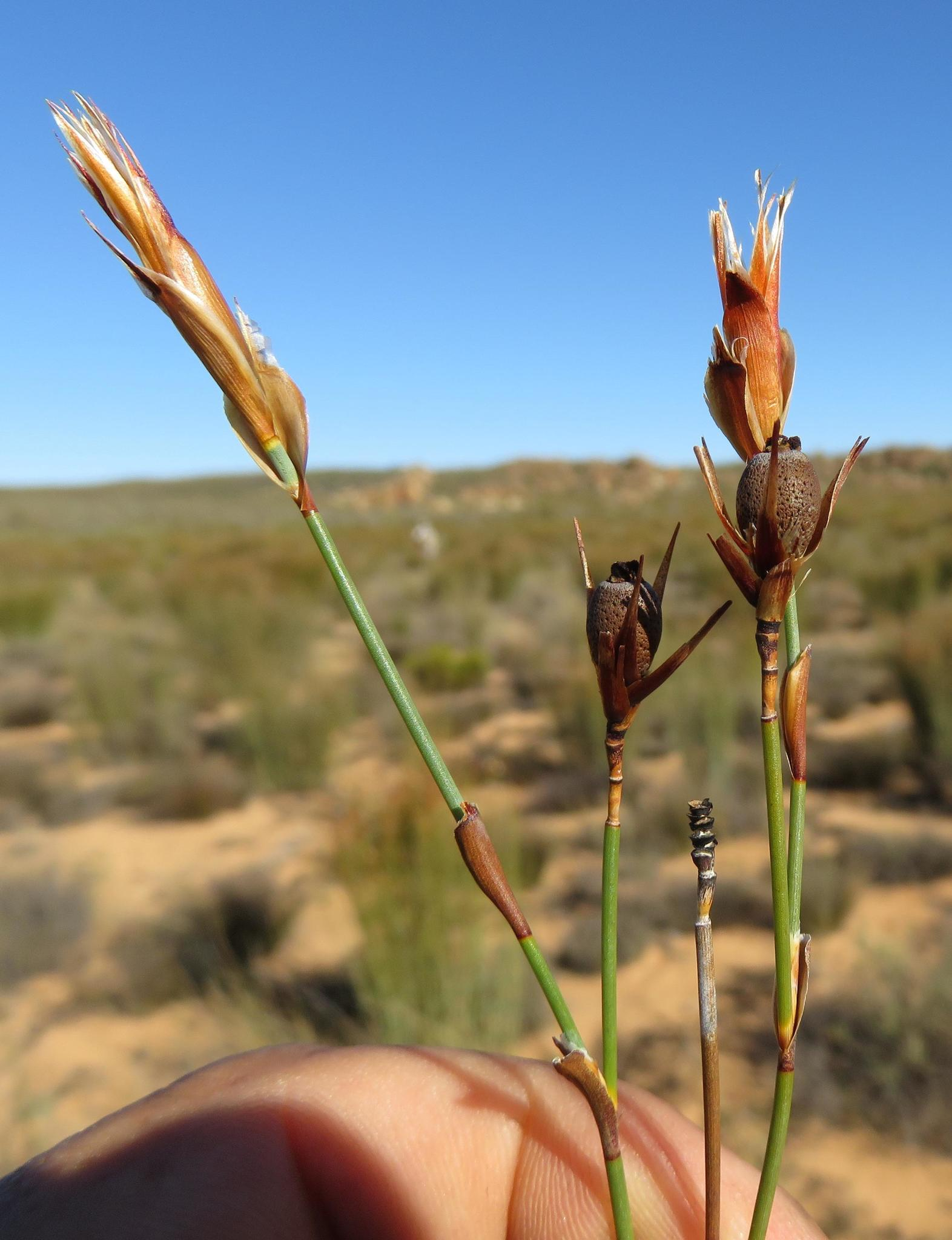
- Willdenowia incurvata

Scientific classification
- Kingdom: Plantae
- Clade: Tracheophytes
- Clade: Angiosperms
- Clade: Monocots
- Clade: Commelinids
- Order: Poales
- Family: Restionaceae
- Genus: Willdenowia; Thunb. 1790 not Willd. 1806

Type species
- Willdenowia striata (syn of W. incurvata) Thunb.

Synonyms
- Willdenovia Thunb.; Nematanthus Nees; Spirostylis Nees ex Mast. 1869, illegitimate homonym, not C.Presl ex Schult. & Schult.f. 1829 (Loranthaceae) nor Raf. 1838 (Marantaceae) nor Baker ex Post & Kuntze 1903 (Malvaceae)

= Willdenowia (plant) =

Genus of flowering plants

Willdenowia is a small genus of flowering plants in the family Restionaceae described as a genus in 1790. The entire genus is endemic to the fynbos of the Western Cape Province of South Africa.

They are rhizomatous, tufted, dioecious perennials, generally with terete, branching stems (Restionaceae more often have simple stems). The leaf sheaths are convolute and persistent. The male flowers grow in numerous spikelets borne in panicled racemes subtended by caducous spathes. Each floret is subtended by a linear or setaceous caducous bract. There are six papery perianth segments, with the inner shorter than the outer. The anthers are oblong and apiculate and the ovaries are rudimentary.

The female spikelets may be single or several. They are borne in spicate cymes subtended by a persistent spathe. The perianth usually has six unequal segments clasping the sessile or stipitate ovary, which usually has a hard cap and a single locule. There are two styles, sometimes partly joined. The staminodes are ligulate. The fruit has pits or tubercles and is indehiscent.

Species

- †Willdenowia affinis
- Willdenowia arescens
- Willdenowia bolusii
- Willdenowia glomerata
- Willdenowia humilis
- Willdenowia incurvata
- Willdenowia pilleata
- Willdenowia purpurea
- Willdenowia rugosa
- Willdenowia stokoei
- Willdenowia sulcata
- Willdenowia teres

Formerly included

moved to other genera: Anthochortus Cannomois Ceratocaryum Chrysitrix Hypodiscus Restio

- W. compressa Steud. 1829 - Chrysitrix capensis
- W. compressa Thunb. 1790 - Cannomois parviflora
- W. decipiens - Ceratocaryum decipiens
- W. ecklonii (Nees) T.Durand & Schinz 1894 not (Nees) Kunth 1841 - Anthochortus ecklonii
- W. esterhuyseniae - Ceratocaryum fimbriatum
- W. fimbriata - Ceratocaryum fimbriatum
- W. fistulosa - Ceratocaryum fistulosum
- W. simplex - Hypodiscus argenteus
- W. striata Spreng. 1824 not Thunb. 1790 - Hypodiscus willdenowia
- W. tristachya - Restio bifidus
- W. xerophila - Ceratocaryum xerophilum
