= Paranomus candicans =

Conservation status
- Least Concern (IUCN 3.1)

Scientific classification
- Kingdom: Plantae
- Clade: Tracheophytes
- Clade: Angiosperms
- Clade: Eudicots
- Order: Proteales
- Family: Proteaceae
- Genus: Paranomus
- Species: P. candicans

Binomial name
- Paranomus candicans (Thunb.) Kuntze

Synonyms
- Nivenia candicans Roem. & Schult.; Nivenia mollissima R.Br.; Paranomus argenteus Knight; Paranomus mollissimus (R.Br.) Kuntze; Protea candicans Thunb.; Protea mollissima (R.Br.) Poir.; Serruria albicans Roem. & Schult.

Species of flowering plant

Paranomus candicans, the powder sceptre, is a flower-bearing shrub that belongs to the genus Paranomus and forms part of the fynbos. The plant is native to the Western Cape, South Africa.

== Description ==
The shrub grows up to 2 m (6.6 ft) tall and flowers mainly from June to November. Fire destroys the plant but the seeds survive. The plant is bisexual and pollinated by insects. The fruit ripens, two months after flowering, and the seeds fall to the ground where they are spread by ants.

In Afrikaans, it is known as poeiersepter.

== Distribution and habitat ==
The plant occurs in the Hex River Mountains up to the Langeberg. The plant grows in sandstone soil at altitudes of 600–2,000 m (2,000–6,600 ft).
