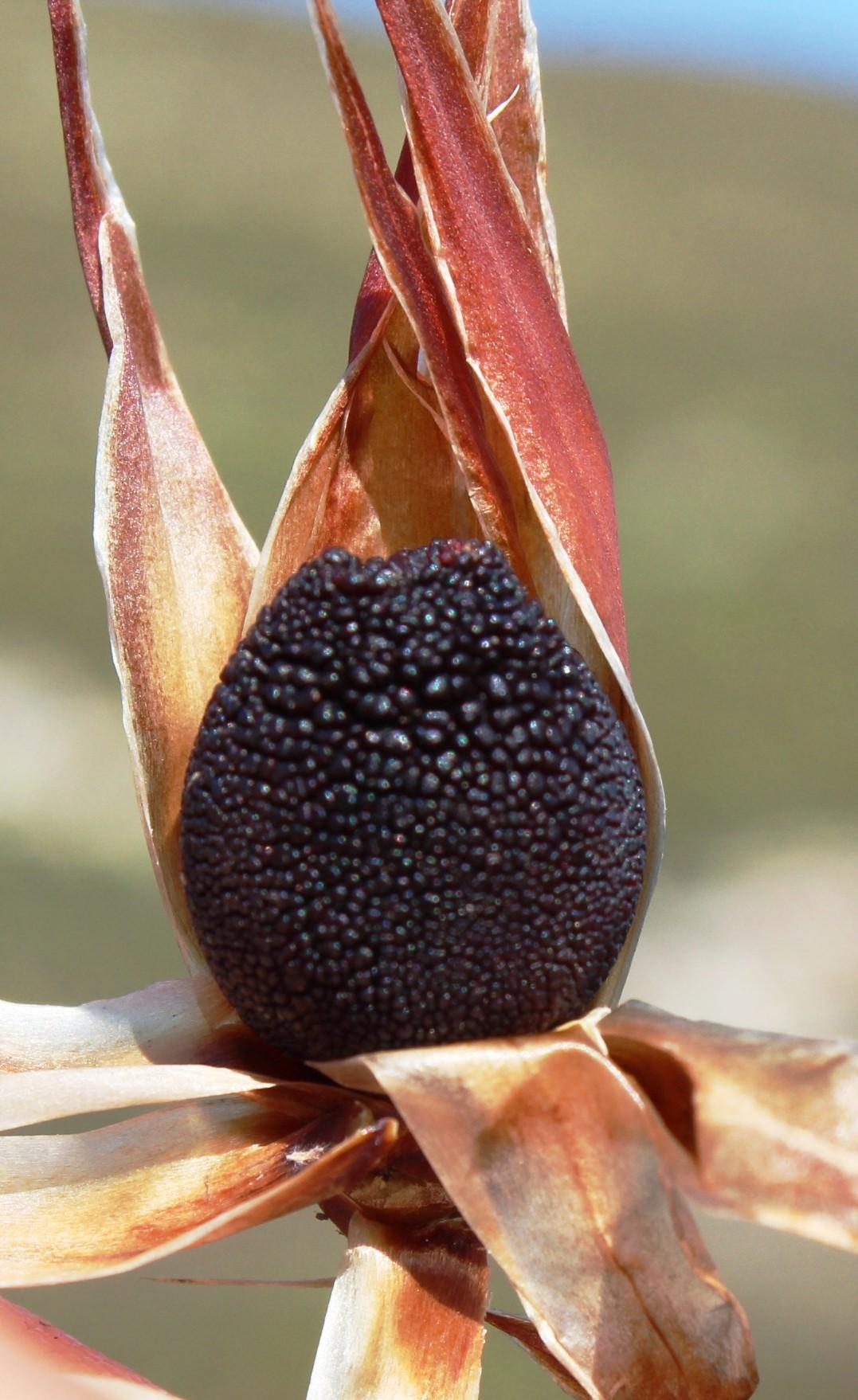
- Ceratocaryum argenteum

Scientific classification
- Kingdom: Plantae
- Clade: Tracheophytes
- Clade: Angiosperms
- Clade: Monocots
- Clade: Commelinids
- Order: Poales
- Family: Restionaceae
- Genus: Ceratocaryum; Nees

Type species
- Ceratocaryum argenteum Nees ex Kunth.

= Ceratocaryum =

Genus of flowering plants

Ceratocaryum is a group of plants in the Restionaceae described as a genus in 1836. The entire genus is endemic to Cape Province in South Africa.

Two species in this genus, Ceratocaryum argenteum and Ceratocaryum pulchrum, have an unusual seed dispersal method. Its berries mimic the appearance and smell of antelope droppings. This tricks dung beetles into gathering and burying them.

Species

- Ceratocaryum argenteum Nees ex Kunth
- Ceratocaryum caespitosum H.P.Linder
- Ceratocaryum decipiens (N.E.Br.) H.P.Linder
- Ceratocaryum fimbriatum (Kunth) H.P.Linder
- Ceratocaryum fistulosum Mast.
- Ceratocaryum persistens H.P.Linder
- Ceratocaryum pulchrum H.P.Linder
- Ceratocaryum xerophilum (Pillans) H.P.Linder
