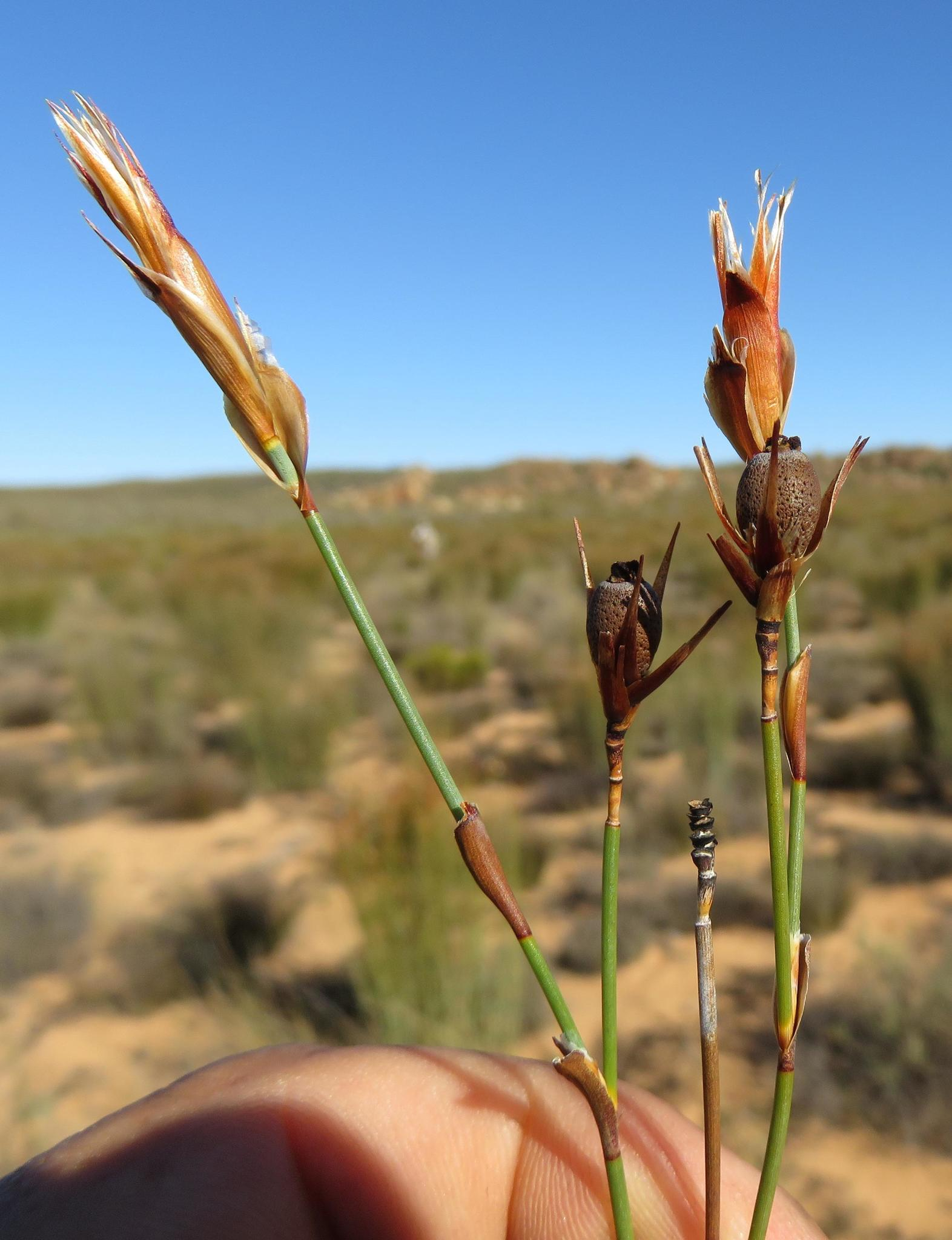

Conservation status
- Least Concern (SANBI Red List)

Scientific classification
- Kingdom: Plantae
- Clade: Tracheophytes
- Clade: Angiosperms
- Clade: Monocots
- Clade: Commelinids
- Order: Poales
- Family: Restionaceae
- Genus: Willdenowia
- Species: W. incurvata

Binomial name
- Willdenowia incurvata (Thunb.) H.P.Linder

Synonyms
- Calopsis incurvata (Thunb.) Kunth; Leptocarpus incurvatus (Thunb.) Mast.; Nematanthus ecklonii Nees; Restio incurvatus Thunb.; Willdenowia cuspidata Mast.; Willdenowia ecklonii (Nees) Kunth; Willdenowia neglecta Steud.; Willdenowia striata Thunb.

= Willdenowia incurvata =

Species of flowering plant endemic to the Fynbos region

Willdenowia incurvata is a species of flowering plant in the genus Willdenowia endemic to the Fynbos region of the Northern Cape and Western Cape. It is also known as the sonqua sunreed; or sonkwasriet in Afrikaans.

== Distribution ==
Willdenowia incurvata is found from False Bay in the Western Cape to Springbok in Namaqualand, in the Northern Cape. It is dominant in the sandveld between Melkbos and the Olifants River, from sea level to the 1 200 m altitude range.

== Ecology ==
Willdenowia incurvata is a reseeder, it reproduces by reseeding after a fire.

== Conservation status ==
Willdenowia incurvata is classified as Least Concern as it is widely distributed, with a stable population.
