= Port Owen =

Marina in Velddrif, South Africa

Coordinates: 32°47′06.57″S 18°09′10.64″E

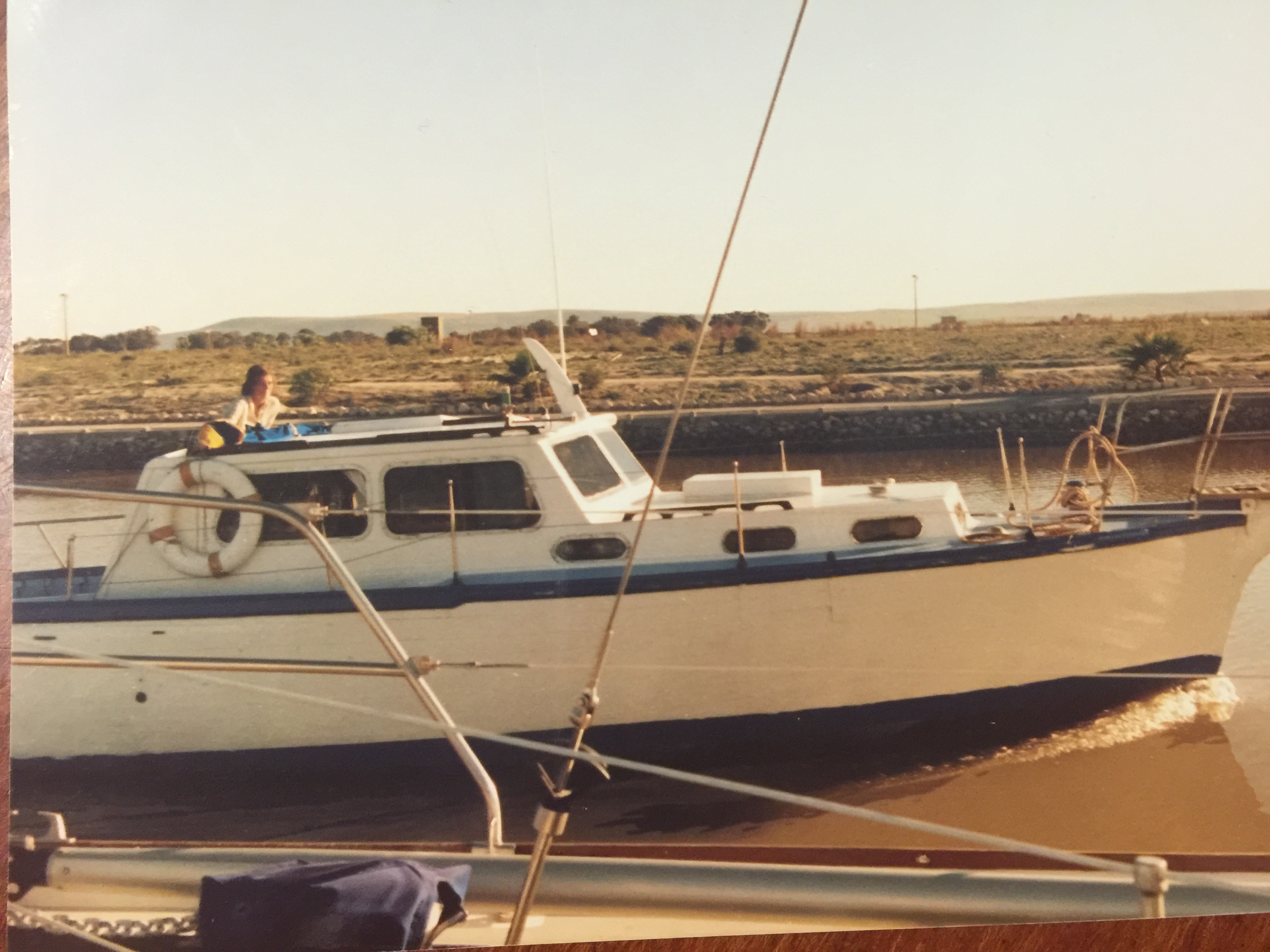
The boat where Port Owen began socialising, which led to the Port Owen Yacht Club, began

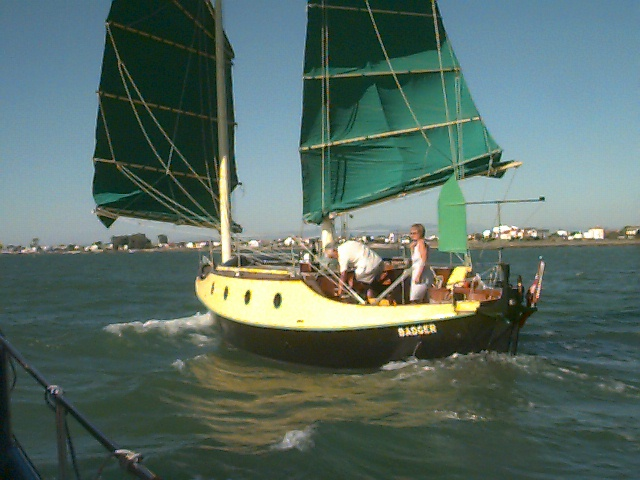
One of the many famous boats that made Port Owen their home

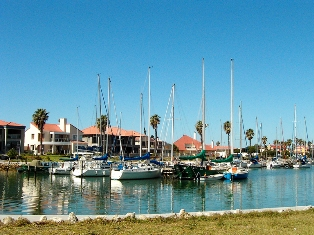

Port Owen is a man-made marina in Velddrif, South Africa. Velddrif, which has incorporated the village of Laaiplek has the lowest crime statistics in South Africa according to the local police station. It comprises 100 hectares and has 3.5 km of waterways which were produced over 15 years of dredging to remove roughly a million tons of dredge.

The marina is surrounded on three sides by the Great Berg River and is 1km from the harbour mouth, where the river meets St. Helena Bay. This bay, the largest on the west coast of Africa, offers the finest sailing conditions on the South African coastline because of its sheltered nature and its orientation to the prevailing summer wind (The South-East Trade, which blows off-shore here). That has been confirmed by Bertie Reed, John Martin, Dave Hudson and many other leading South African sailors.

In 1497, Vasco da Gama landed here and recorded, "The dogs here sound just like the ones in Portugal". A monument was later erected on the shore by the Portuguese government.

The marina is adjacent to the fishing harbour of Laaiplek and is surrounded by salt marsh. The area is renowned for its bird life and for the over 350 different sea, land and river birds that are found here.

Port Owen is named after H. Owen Wiggins Junior, who recognising the potential for a Florida-style residential marina developed the marshy farm land, creating its residential and commercial plots and all the infrastructure. He also established the Port Owen Yacht Club, which grew from Friday evening sundowners on his advertising manager Gideon Langart's 36' yacht, Absolutely! to a large and thriving club.

The original plan set aside the Marina Centre, which has become the commercial centre of Port Owen. The Harbour Centre shopping centre has a health spa, pub, restaurant, hairdressing salon, cafe, fishing tackle shop and estate agency. Adjacent is a brewery, distillery and restaurant. Owen Wiggins went on to create the Langebaan Country Club.

Port Owen was the first deep-sea residential marina developed in South Africa. The waterways are controlled by the Port Owen Marina Authority. For many years, it was the home of Roamer, Bob Burn's boat on which he became the 32nd man to sail around the world single-handedly. Its bell is on display at Gideon Estates.

Port Owen is surrounded on three sides by the Berg River, which limits its future growth and ensures that it remains restful and exclusive. In the heart of Port Owen is Admiral Island, a privately run security estate that is accessible only by the entry-controlled bridge or from the water. The shoreline of Admiral Island is monitored by 24-hour-monitored security cameras and rapid-response armed security. The lifestyle on Admiral Island is very relaxed and secure as can be seen from the boats and equipment in the yards of unfenced houses.

Port Owen has a slipway, three restaurants, a microbrewery a gin distillery and shops. The river is navigable for 56 km for shallow-drought boats.
