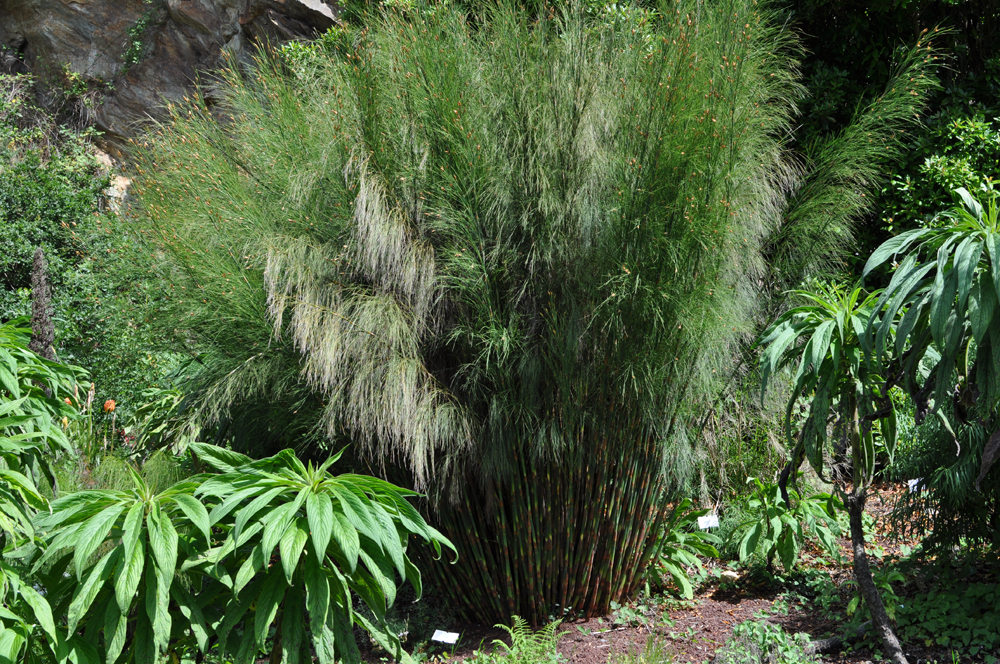
- Cannomois virgata

Scientific classification
- Kingdom: Plantae
- Clade: Tracheophytes
- Clade: Angiosperms
- Clade: Monocots
- Clade: Commelinids
- Order: Poales
- Family: Restionaceae
- Genus: Cannomois; P.Beauv. ex Desv.

Type species
- Cannomois cephalotes Desv.

Synonyms
- Cucullifera Nees; Mesanthus Nees

= Cannomois =

Genus of flowering plants

Cannomois is a group of plants in the Restionaceae described as a genus in 1828. The entire genus is endemic to Cape Province in South Africa.

Species

- Cannomois anfracta H.P.Linder
- Cannomois arenicola H.P.Linder
- Cannomois aristata Mast.
- Cannomois congesta Mast.
- Cannomois grandis H.P.Linder
- Cannomois nitida (Nees ex Mast.) Pillans
- Cannomois parviflora (Thunb.) Pillans
- Cannomois primosii (Pillans) H.P.Linder
- Cannomois robusta (Kunth) H.P.Linder
- Cannomois scirpoides (Kunth) Mast.
- Cannomois taylorii H.P.Linder
- Cannomois virgata (Rottb.) Steud.
