= Paramapania simplex =

Scientific classification
- Kingdom: Plantae
- Clade: Embryophytes
- Clade: Tracheophytes
- Clade: Angiosperms
- Clade: Monocots
- Clade: Commelinids
- Order: Poales
- Family: Cyperaceae
- Genus: Paramapania
- Species: P. simplex

Binomial name
- Paramapania simplex (Ridl.) Uittien

Synonyms
- Mapania simplex (Ridl.) T.Koyama; Thoracostachyum simplex Ridl.

Species of flowering plant

Paramapania simplex is a species of sedge. It is native to the island of New Guinea.
