= Paramapania =

Scientific classification
- Kingdom: Plantae
- Clade: Embryophytes
- Clade: Tracheophytes
- Clade: Angiosperms
- Clade: Monocots
- Clade: Commelinids
- Order: Poales
- Family: Cyperaceae
- Genus: Paramapania; Uittien

Genus of plants

Paramapania is a genus of flowering plants belonging to the family Cyperaceae.

Its native range is Malesia to Western Pacific.

== Species ==
Species:

- Paramapania flaccida Uittien
- Paramapania gracillima (Kük. & Merr.) Uittien
- Paramapania longirostris (Kük.) Uittien
- Paramapania parvibractea (C.B.Clarke) Uittien
- Paramapania radians (C.B.Clarke) Uittien
- Paramapania rostrata Uittien
- Paramapania simplex (Ridl.) Uittien
