= List of Carex species =

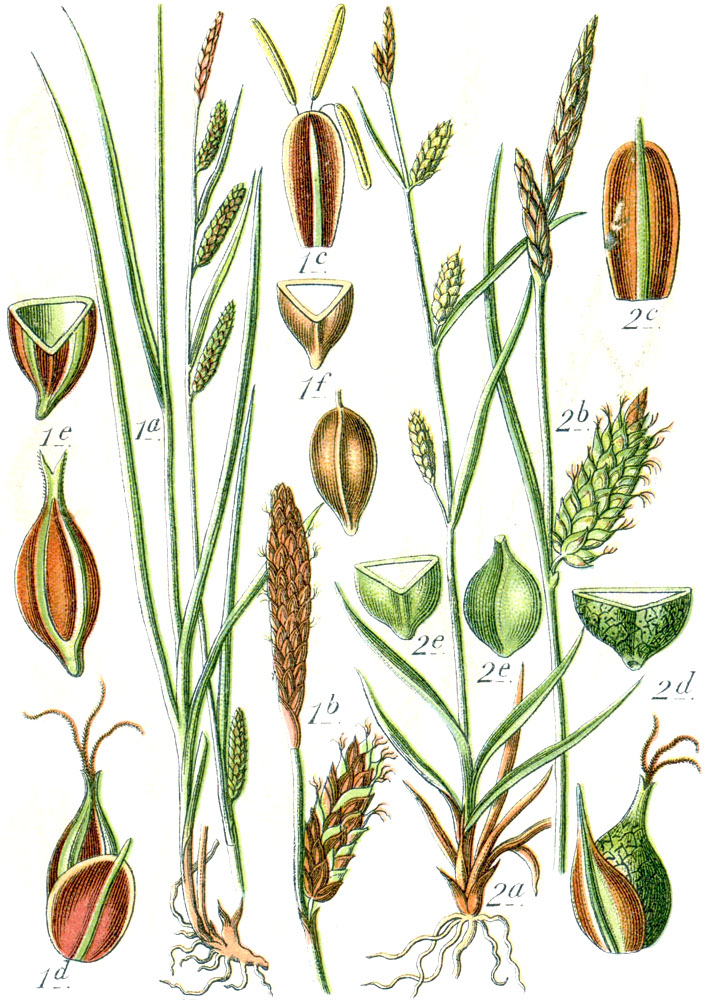
Illustration of two species of Carex, from Deutschlands Flora in Abbildungen (1796): 1. C. binervis; 2. C. punctata

The genus Carex, the sedges, is one of the largest genera of flowering plants, containing over 2000 species, according to the Royal Botanic Gardens at Kew. In May 2015, the Global Carex Group argued for a broader circumscription of Carex, which added all the species formerly classified in Cymophyllus (1 species), Kobresia (c. 60 species), Schoenoxiphium (c. 15 species) and Uncinia (c. 70 species). As of May 2024, all the currently recognised species (including hybrid species) in the genus Carex are given below:

== Species ==
=== A ===
- Carex × abitibiana Lepage
- Carex aboriginum M.E.Jones
- Carex × abortiva Holmb.
- Carex abrupta Mack.
- Carex abscondita Mack.
- Carex acaulis d'Urv.
- Carex accrescens Ohwi – Seoul sedge
- Carex acicularis Boott
- Carex acidicola Naczi
- Carex acocksii C.Archer
- Carex acuta L.
- Carex acutata Boott
- Carex acutiformis Ehrh.
- Carex adelostoma V.I.Krecz.
- Carex adrienii E.G.Camus
- Carex × adulterina Chenevard
- Carex adusta Boott
- Carex aematorrhyncha Desv.
- Carex aequialta Kük.
- Carex × aestivaliformis Mack.
- Carex aestivalis M.A.Curtis ex A.Gray
- Carex aethiopica Schkuhr
- Carex agastachys L.f.
- Carex agglomerata C.B.Clarke
- Carex aggregata Mack.
- Carex × akitaensis Fujiw.
- Carex × akiyamana Ohwi
- Carex alajica Litv.
- Carex alascana Boeckeler
- Carex alata Torr.
- Carex alatauensis S.R.Zhang
- Carex alba Scop.
- Carex albata Boott ex Franch. – ditch sedge
- Carex albert-smithii T.Koyama
- Carex × albertii H.Lév.
- Carex albicans Willd. ex Spreng.
- Carex albidibasis T.Koyama
- Carex albolutescens Schwein.
- Carex albonigra Mack.
- Carex alboviridis C.B.Clarke
- Carex albula Allan
- Carex albursina E.Sheld.
- Carex algida Turcz. ex V.I.Krecz.
- Carex allanii Hamlin
- Carex alligata Boott
- Carex alliiformis C.B.Clarke
- Carex allivescens V.I.Krecz.
- Carex × allolepis Rchb.
- Carex × alluvialis Figert
- Carex alma L.H.Bailey
- Carex × almii Holmb.
- Carex alopecoidea Tuck.
- Carex alopecuroides D.Don ex Tilloch & Taylor
- Carex × alsatica Zahn
- Carex alsophila F.Muell.
- Carex alta Boott
- Carex altaica Gorodkov
- Carex alterniflora Franch.
- Carex amgunensis F.Schmidt
- Carex amicta Boott
- Carex amphibola Steud.
- Carex amplectens Mack.
- Carex amplifolia Boott
- Carex anbouensis Katsuy.
- Carex andersonii Boott
- Carex andina Phil.
- Carex andringitrensis Cherm.
- Carex angolensis Nelmes
- Carex angusta (C.B.Clarke) Sameer Patil
- Carex angustata Boott
- Carex angustealata (Akiyama) S.Fujii & N.Kurosaki
- Carex angustilepis Reznicek & S.González
- Carex angustispica Reznicek & S.González
- Carex angustisquama Franch.
- Carex angustiutricula F.T.Wang & Tang ex L.K.Dai
- Carex × aniaiensis Fujiw. & Y.Matsuda
- Carex anisoneura V.I.Krecz.
- Carex anisostachys Liebm.
- Carex annectens (E.P.Bicknell) E.P.Bicknell
- Carex anomoea Hand.-Mazz.
- Carex anthoxanthea J.Presl & C.Presl
- Carex antoniensis A.Chev.
- Carex antucensis Kunze ex Kunth
- Carex aperta Boott
- Carex aphanolepis Franch. & Sav. – nerved-scale sedge
- Carex aphylla Kunth
- Carex aphyllopus Kük.
- Carex apoiensis Akiyama
- Carex appalachica J.M.Webber & P.W.Ball
- Carex appendiculata (Trautv. & C.A.Mey.) Kük. – appendicular sedge
- Carex applanata Thorsen et de Lange
- Carex appressa R.Br.
- Carex appropinquata Schumach.
- Carex aquatilis Wahlenb.
- Carex × arakanei T.Koyama
- Carex arcatica Meinsh.
- Carex arapahoensis Clokey
- Carex archeri Boott
- Carex arcta Boott
- Carex arctata Boott
- Carex arctiformis Mack.
- Carex arctogena Harry Sm.
- Carex × arctophila F.Nyl.
- Carex arenaria L.
- Carex arenicola F.Schmidt – wet-sand sedge
- Carex argentina Barros
- Carex argunensis Turcz. ex Ledeb.
- Carex argyi H.Lév. & Vaniot
- Carex argyrantha Tuck. ex Boott
- Carex aridula V.I.Krecz.
- Carex arimaensis (Ohwi) T.Hoshino
- Carex arisanensis Hayata
- Carex aristatisquamata Tang & F.T.Wang ex L.K.Dai
- Carex aristulifera P.C.Li
- Carex arizonica Licher, G.Rink & Reznicek
- Carex arkansana (L.H.Bailey) L.H.Bailey
- Carex arnellii Christ ex Scheutz – Musan sedge
- Carex arnottiana Nees ex Drejer
- Carex arsenei Kük.
- Carex × arthuriana C.L.Beckm. & Figert
- Carex ascotreta C.B. Clarke – long Mokpo sedge
- Carex aspericaulis (G.A.Wheeler) J.R.Starr
- Carex asperifructus Kük.
- Carex asraoi D.M.Verma
- Carex assiniboinensis W.Boott
- Carex astricta K.A.Ford
- Carex asturica Boiss.
- Carex asynchrona Naczi
- Carex aterrima Hoppe
- Carex atherodes Spreng.
- Carex athrostachya Olney
- Carex atlantica L.H.Bailey
- Carex atlasica (H.Lindb.) Tattou
- Carex atractodes F.J.Herm.
- Carex atrata L. – black-spike sedge
- Carex atratiformis Britton
- Carex atrivaginata Nelmes
- Carex atrofusca Schkuhr
- Carex atrofuscoides K.T.Fu
- Carex atropicta Steud.
- Carex atrosquama Mack.
- Carex auceps (de Lange & Heenan) K.A.Ford
- Carex aucklandica (Hamlin) K.A.Ford
- Carex augustinowiczii Meinsh. – Augustinowicz's sedge
- Carex aurea Nutt.
- Carex aureolensis Steud.
- Carex auriculata Franch.
- Carex × auroniensis L.C.Lamb.
- Carex austrina Mack.
- Carex austro-occidentalis F.T.Wang & Tang ex Y.C.Tang
- Carex austroalpina Bech.
- Carex austroamericana G.A.Wheeler
- Carex austrocaroliniana L.H.Bailey
- Carex austrocompacta K.L.Wilson
- Carex austrodeflexa P.D.McMillan, Sorrie & van Eerden
- Carex austrojacutensis Schekhovts.
- Carex austrolucorum (Rettig) D.B.Poind. & Naczi
- Carex austromexicana Reznicek
- Carex austrosinensis Tang & F.T.Wang ex S.Y.Liang
- Carex austrosulcata K.L.Wilson
- Carex austrotenella K.L.Wilson
- Carex austrozhejiangensis C.Z.Zheng & X.F.Jin
- Carex autumnalis Ohwi – Autumnal sand sedge
- Carex ayako-maedae T.Koyama
- Carex aztecica Mack.

=== B ===
- Carex baccans Nees
- Carex backii Boott
- Carex badilloi Luceño & Márq.-Corro
- Carex baileyi Britton
- Carex baimaensis S.W.Su
- Carex baiposhanensis P.C.Li
- Carex bajacalifornica Zika
- Carex × bakkeriana D.T.E.Ploeg & Rudolphy
- Carex balansae Franch.
- Carex baldensis L.
- Carex balfourii Kük.
- Carex ballsii Nelmes
- Carex baltzellii Chapm.
- Carex bamaensis X.F.Jin & W.Jie Chen
- Carex bambusetorum Merr.
- Carex banksiana K.A.Ford
- Carex banksii Boott
- Carex baohuashanica Tang & F.T.Wang ex L.K.Dai
- Carex barbarae Dewey
- Carex barbata Boott
- Carex barbayaki Jim.Mejías & Roalson
- Carex baronii Baker
- Carex barrattii Torr. ex Schwein.
- Carex basiantha Steud.
- Carex basiflora C.B.Clarke
- Carex basutorum (Turrill) Luceño & Martín-Bravo
- Carex bathiei H.Lév.
- Carex bavicola Raymond
- Carex bebbii (L.H.Bailey) Olney ex Fernald
- Carex beckii G.A.Wheeler
- Carex × beckmanniana Figert
- Carex × beckmannii Keck
- Carex bella L.H.Bailey
- Carex × bengyana H.Lév. & L.C.Lamb.
- Carex benkei Tak.Shimizu
- Carex bequaertii De Wild.
- Carex bermudiana Hemsl.
- Carex berteroniana Steud.
- Carex bhutanensis S.R.Zhang
- Carex bichenoviana Boott
- Carex bicknellii Britton & A.Br.
- Carex bicolor Bellardi ex All.
- Carex biegensis Cherm.
- Carex bigelowii Torr. ex Schwein. – Gwanmo sedge
- Carex × biharica Simonk.
- Carex bijiangensis S.Yun Liang & S.R.Zhang
- Carex bilateralis Hayata
- Carex billingsii (O.W.Knight) Kirschb.
- Carex biltmoreana Mack.
- Carex × binderi Podp.
- Carex binervis Sm.
- Carex bistaminata (W.Z.Di & M.J.Zhong) S.R.Zhang
- Carex bitchuensis T.Hoshino & H.Ikeda
- Carex biwensis Franch.
- Carex blakei Nelmes
- Carex blanda Dewey
- Carex blepharicarpa Franch. – ciliated-fruit sedge
- Carex blinii H.Lév. & Vaniot
- Carex bodinieri Franch.
- Carex boecheriana Á.Löve, D.Löve & Raymond
- Carex boelckeiana Barros
- Carex × boenninghausiana Weihe
- Carex × bogstadensis Kük.
- Carex bohemica Schreb.
- Carex bolanderi Olney
- Carex × bolina O.Lang
- Carex boliviensis Van Heurck & Müll.Arg.
- Carex bonanzensis Britton – yukon sedge
- Carex bonariensis Desf. ex Poir.
- Carex bonatiana (Kük.) N.A.Ivanova
- Carex bonplandii Kunth
- Carex borbonica Lam.
- Carex borealifujianica Y.F.Lu & X.F.Jin
- Carex borealihinganica Y.L.Chang & Y.L.Yang
- Carex borealipolaris S.R.Zhang
- Carex borii Nelmes
- Carex boryana Schkuhr
- Carex × bosoensis Yashiro
- Carex bostrychostigma Maxim. – curled-stigma sedge
- Carex brachyanthera Ohwi
- Carex brachycalama Griseb.
- Carex brachystachys Schrank
- Carex bracteosa (Rchb.) Kunze ex Kunth
- Carex bradei Gross
- Carex brainerdii Mack.
- Carex brandisii (C.B.Clarke ex Jana & R.C.Srivast.) O.Yano
- Carex brasiliensis A.St.-Hil.
- Carex brehmeri Boeckeler
- Carex breviaristata K.T.Fu
- Carex brevicaulis Thouars
- Carex brevicollis DC.
- Carex breviculmis R.Br. – mountain nerved-fruit sedge
- Carex brevicuspis C.B.Clarke
- Carex brevihispida X.F.Jin & Y.F.Lu
- Carex brevior (Dewey) Mack. ex Lunell
- Carex breviprophylla O.Yano
- Carex breviscapa C.B.Clarke
- Carex brevispicula G.H.Nam & G.Y.Chung
- Carex breweri Boott
- Carex brizoides L.
- Carex bromoides Willd.
- Carex brongniartii Kunth
- Carex brownii Tuck. – Brown's sedge
- Carex brunnea Thunb.
- Carex brunnescens (Pers.) Poir.
- Carex brunnipes Reznicek
- Carex brysonii Naczi
- Carex buchananii Berggr.
- Carex bucharica Kük.
- Carex buekii Wimm.
- Carex bulbostylis Mack.
- Carex bullata Willd.
- Carex burangensis (Y.C.Yang) S.R.Zhang
- Carex burchelliana Boeckeler
- Carex burkei (C.B.Clarke) Luceño & Martín-Bravo
- Carex burttii Noltie
- Carex bushii Mack.
- Carex buxbaumii Wahlenb. – marsh sedge

=== C ===
- Carex cabralii Reznicek & S.González
- Carex caduca Boott
- Carex caeligena Reznicek
- Carex × caesariensis Mack.
- Carex caespititia Nees
- Carex calcicola Tang & F.T.Wang
- Carex calcifugens Naczi
- Carex calcis K.A.Ford
- Carex californica L.H.Bailey
- Carex callista Nelmes
- Carex callitrichos V.I.Krecz.
- Carex cambodiensis Nelmes
- Carex camposii Boiss. & Reut.
- Carex camptoglochin V.I.Krecz.
- Carex canariensis Kük.
- Carex × candrianii Kneuck.
- Carex canescens L. – silvery sedge
- Carex canina Dunn
- Carex capensis Thunb.
- Carex capillacea Boott – tiny sedge
- Carex capillaris L. – hair-like sedge
- Carex capilliculmis S.R.Zhang
- Carex capillifolia (Decne.) S.R.Zhang
- Carex capilliformis Franch.
- Carex capitata Sol.
- Carex capitellata Boiss. & Balansa
- Carex capricornis Meinsh. ex Maxim. – capricornis sedge, short-hair spring sedge
- Carex cardiolepis Nees
- Carex careyana Torr. ex Dewey
- Carex × cariei Aubin
- Carex caroliniana Schwein.
- Carex carsei Petrie
- Carex caryophyllea Latourr.
- Carex castanea Wahlenb.
- Carex castanostachya K.Schum. ex Kük.
- Carex castroviejoi Luceño & Jim.Mejías
- Carex catamarcensis C.B.Clarke ex Kük.
- Carex cataphyllodes Nelmes
- Carex cataractae R.Br.
- Carex catharinensis Boeckeler
- Carex caucasica Steven
- Carex caudata (Kük.) Pereda & Laínz
- Carex caudispicata F.T.Wang & Tang ex P.C.Li
- Carex cavaleriensis H.Lév. & Vaniot
- Carex caxinensis F.J.Herm.
- Carex × cayouettei A.Bergeron
- Carex celebica Kük.
- Carex × cenantha A.E.Kozhevn.
- Carex cephaloidea (Dewey) Dewey ex Boott
- Carex cephalophora Muhl. ex Willd.
- Carex cephalotes F.Muell.
- Carex cercidascus C.B.Clarke
- Carex cercostachys Franch.
- Carex cespitosa L. – turfy sedge
- Carex × cetica Rech.
- Carex ceylanica Boeckeler
- Carex chalciolepis Holm
- Carex chapmanii Steud.
- Carex chathamica Petrie
- Carex cheesemanniana (Boeckeler) K.A.Ford
- Carex cheniana Tang & F.T.Wang ex S.Y.Liang
- Carex chermezonii Luceño & Martín-Bravo
- Carex cherokeensis Schwein.
- Carex chiapensis F.J.Herm.
- Carex chichijimensis Katsuy.
- Carex chihuahuensis Mack.
- Carex chikungana L.H.Bailey
- Carex chilensis Brongn.
- Carex chinensis Retz.
- Carex chinganensis Litv.
- Carex chinoi Ohwi ex T.Koyama
- Carex chiovendae Pamp.
- Carex chiwuana F.T.Wang & Tang ex P.C.Li
- Carex chlorantha R.Br.
- Carex chlorocephalula F.T.Wang & Tang ex P.C.Li
- Carex chlorolepis Steud.
- Carex chlorosaccus C.B.Clarke
- Carex chlorostachys Steven
- Carex chordalis Liebm.
- Carex chordorrhiza L.f. – creeping sedge
- Carex chosenica Ohwi – Korean sedge
- Carex chrysolepis Franch. & Sav.
- Carex chuii Nelmes
- Carex chungii Z.P.Wang
- Carex ciliatomarginata Nakai
- Carex cilicica Boiss.
- Carex cinerascens Kük. – ashgrey sedge
- Carex circinata C.A.Mey.
- Carex cirrhosa Berggr.
- Carex cirrhulosa Nees
- Carex × clausa Holmb.
- Carex clavata Thunb.
- Carex clavispica S.R.Zhang
- Carex clivorum Ohwi
- Carex cochinchinensis Raymond
- Carex cochranei Reznicek
- Carex cockayneana Kük.
- Carex cognata Kunth
- Carex colchica J.Gay
- Carex colensoi Boott
- Carex collimitanea V.I.Krecz.
- Carex collinsii Nutt.
- Carex collumanthus (Steyerm.) L.E.Mora
- Carex comans Berggr.
- Carex commixta Steud.
- Carex communis L.H.Bailey
- Carex comosa Boott
- Carex complanata Torr. & Hook.
- Carex complexa Reznicek & S.González
- Carex composita Boott
- Carex concava H.B.Yang, Xiao X.Li & G.D.Liu
- Carex concinna R.Br.
- Carex concinnoides Mack.
- Carex condensata Nees
- Carex conferta Hochst. ex A.Rich.
- Carex confertiflora Boott
- Carex congdonii L.H.Bailey
- Carex congestiflora Reznicek & S.González
- Carex congolensis Turrill
- Carex conica Boott – miniature sedge
- Carex conicoides Honda
- Carex coninux (F.T.Wang & Tang) S.R.Zhang
- Carex conjuncta Boott
- Carex × connectens Holmb.
- Carex conoidea Willd.
- Carex consanguinea Kunth
- Carex conspecta Mack.
- Carex conspissata V.I.Krecz.
- Carex constanceana Stacey
- Carex continua C.B.Clarke
- Carex contracta F.Muell.
- Carex cordillerana Saarela & B.A.Ford
- Carex cordouei H.Lév.
- Carex coriacea Hamlin
- Carex coriogyne Nelmes
- Carex coriophora Fisch. & C.A.Mey. ex Kunth
- Carex corrugata Fernald
- Carex × corstorphinei Druce
- Carex cortesii Liebm.
- Carex corynoidea K.A.Ford
- Carex × costei Rouy
- Carex coulteri Boott ex Hemsl.
- Carex courtallensis Nees ex Boott
- Carex coxiana Petrie
- Carex cranaocarpa Nelmes
- Carex craspedotricha Nelmes
- Carex crassibasis H.Lév. & Vaniot
- Carex crassiflora Kük.
- Carex crassipes Boeckeler
- Carex crawei Dewey ex Torr.
- Carex crawfordii Fernald
- Carex crebra V.I.Krecz.
- Carex crebriflora Wiegand
- Carex cremnicola K.A.Ford
- Carex cremostachys Franch.
- Carex × crepinii Torges
- Carex cretica Gradst. & J.Kern
- Carex crinalis Boott
- Carex crinita Lam.
- Carex × crinitoides Lepage
- Carex crispa K.A.Ford
- Carex cristatella Britton
- Carex cruciata Wahlenb.
- Carex cruenta Nees
- Carex crus-corvi Shuttlew. ex Kunze
- Carex × cryptochlaena Holm
- Carex cryptolepis Mack.
- Carex cryptosperma Zika, D.S.Bell & L.J.Gross
- Carex cryptostachys Brongn.
- Carex × csomadensis Simonk.
- Carex cubensis Kük.
- Carex cuchumatanensis Standl. & Steyerm.
- Carex cucullata (Kük.) Ohwi
- Carex culmenicola Steyerm.
- Carex cumberlandensis Naczi, Kral & Bryson
- Carex cumulata (L.H.Bailey) Mack.
- Carex curaica Kunth
- Carex curatorum Stacey
- Carex curta Gooden.
- Carex curticeps C.B.Clarke
- Carex curtispica K.T.Takah. & M.N.Tamura
- Carex curvata Knaf
- Carex curvicollis Franch. & Sav.
- Carex curviculmis Reznicek
- Carex curvula All.
- Carex cusickii Mack.
- Carex cuspidosa Dunn
- Carex cyanea K.A.Ford
- Carex cylindrostachys Franch.
- Carex cyprica Molina Gonz., Acedo & Llamas
- Carex cyrtostachya Janeway & Zika

=== D ===
- Carex dabieensis S.W.Su
- Carex dacica Heuff.
- Carex dahurica Kük.
- Carex dailingensis Y.L.Chou
- Carex daisenensis Nakai
- Carex dallii Kirk
- Carex daltoni Boott
- Carex damiaoshanensis X.F.Jin & C.Z.Zheng
- Carex damingshanica Z.C.Lu & X.F.Jin
- Carex × danielis H.Lév.
- Carex dapanshanica X.F.Jin, Y.J.Zhao & Zi L.Chen
- Carex darwinii Boott
- Carex dasycarpa Muhl.
- Carex davalliana Sm.
- Carex david-smithii Reznicek
- Carex davidi Franch.
- Carex davisii Schwein. & Torr.
- Carex davyi Mack.
- Carex dawsonii (Hamlin) K.L.Wilson
- Carex daxinensis Y.Y.Zhou & X.F.Jin
- Carex dayuongensis Z.P.Wang
- Carex × deamii F.J.Herm.
- Carex deasyi (C.B.Clarke) O.Yano & S.R.Zhang
- Carex debeauxii H.Lév. & Vaniot
- Carex debilior (F.Muell.) K.L.Wilson
- Carex debilis Michx.
- Carex decidua Boott
- Carex deciduisquama F.T.Wang & Tang ex P.C.Li
- Carex declinata Boott
- Carex × decolorans Wimm.
- Carex decomposita Muhl.
- Carex decora Boott
- Carex decurtata Cheeseman
- Carex deflexa Hornem.
- Carex × deinbolliana J.Gay
- Carex delacosta Kuntze
- Carex delavayi Franch.
- Carex delicata C.B.Clarke
- Carex delongii Shekhovts. & Lashch.
- Carex demissa Hornem.
- Carex densa (L.H.Bailey) L.H.Bailey
- Carex densicaespitosa L.K.Dai
- Carex densifimbriata Tang & F.T.Wang
- Carex densipilosa C.Z.Zheng & X.F.Jin
- Carex dentata Reznicek & S.González
- Carex depauperata Curtis ex Woodw.
- Carex depressa Link
- Carex deqinensis L.K.Dai
- Carex × derelicta Štěpánková
- Carex × descendens Kük.
- Carex × deserta Merino
- Carex desponsa Boott
- Carex devia Cheeseman
- Carex deweyana Schwein.
- Carex dianae Steud.
- Carex diandra Schrank
- Carex diaoluoshanica H.B.Yang, G.D.Liu & Qing L.Wang
- Carex diastena V.I.Krecz.
- Carex dickinsii Franch. & Sav. – Dickins' sedge
- Carex dielsiana Kük.
- Carex digitalis Willd.
- Carex digitata L.
- Carex dikei (Nelmes) K.L.Wilson
- Carex diluta M.Bieb.
- Carex diminuta Boeckeler
- Carex dimorpholepis Steud. – dimorphous-spike sedge
- Carex dioica L.
- Carex diplodon Nelmes
- Carex dipsacea Berggr.
- Carex discoidea Boott
- Carex dispalata Boott – curved-utricle sedge
- Carex disperma Dewey – two-seed sedge
- Carex dissita Sol. ex Boott
- Carex dissitiflora Franch.
- Carex distachya Desf.
- Carex distans L.
- Carex distentiformis F.J.Herm.
- Carex disticha Huds.
- Carex distincta (Kukkonen) Luceño & Martín-Bravo
- Carex distracta C.B.Clarke
- Carex divisa Huds.
- Carex divulsa Stokes
- Carex doenitzii Boeckeler
- Carex doisutepensis T.Koyama
- Carex dolichocarpa C.A.Mey. ex V.I.Krecz.
- Carex dolichophylla J.R.Starr
- Carex dolichostachya Hayata
- Carex dolomitica Heenan & de Lange
- Carex doniana Spreng. – Don's sedge
- Carex donnell-smithii L.H.Bailey
- Carex × doroyuensis K.Nagas., S.Sakag. & K.Sawa
- Carex douglasii Boott
- Carex drepanorhyncha Franch.
- Carex druceana Hamlin
- Carex drucei (Hamlin) K.A.Ford
- Carex drukyulensis (Noltie) Jim.Mejías & Noltie
- Carex drymophila Turcz. – forest-live sedge
- Carex × ducellieri Beauverd
- Carex × duereriana Kük.
- Carex × dufftii Hausskn.
- Carex × dumanii Lepage
- Carex durangensis Reznicek & S.González
- Carex durieui Steud. ex Kunze
- Carex duriuscula C.A.Mey.
- Carex dusenii Kük. ex Dusén
- Carex duvaliana Franch. & Sav.

=== E ===
- Carex earistata F.T.Wang & Y.L.Chang ex S.Yun Liang
- Carex ebenea Rydb.
- Carex eburnea Boott
- Carex echinata Murray – star sedge
- Carex echinochloe Kunze
- Carex echinodes (Fernald) P.Rothr., Reznicek & Hipp
- Carex echinus Ohwi
- Carex ecklonii Nees
- Carex ecostata C.B.Clarke
- Carex ecuadorensis (G.A.Wheeler & Goetgh.) J.R.Starr
- Carex ecuadorica Kük.
- Carex edgariae Hamlin
- Carex edura K.A.Ford
- Carex edwardsiana E.L.Bridges & Orzell
- Carex egena H.Lév. & Vaniot
- Carex egglestonii Mack.
- Carex egmontiana (Hamlin) K.A.Ford
- Carex egorovae Molina Gonz., Acedo & Llamas
- Carex ekmanii Kük.
- Carex × elanescens Cif. & Giacom.
- Carex elata All.
- Carex elatior Boeckeler
- Carex eleusinoides Turcz. ex Kunth – goosegrass sedge
- Carex elgonensis Nelmes
- Carex elingamita Hamlin
- Carex × elisabethae J.Andres, Carbo, Llamas & M.Perez
- Carex elliottii Schwein. & Torr.
- Carex elongata L.
- Carex eluta Nelmes
- Carex elynoides Holm
- Carex × elytroides Fr.
- Carex eminens Nees
- Carex × emmae L.Gross
- Carex emoryi Dewey
- Carex enanderi Hultén
- Carex endlichii Kük.
- Carex enervis C.A.Mey.
- Carex engelmannii L.H.Bailey
- Carex enneastachya C.B.Clarke
- Carex enokii Molina Gonz., Acedo & Llamas
- Carex enysii Petrie
- Carex erawinensis Korotky
- Carex erebus K.A.Ford
- Carex ereica Tang & F.T.Wang ex L.K.Dai
- Carex eremopyroides V.I.Krecz.
- Carex eremostachya S.T.Blake
- Carex ericetorum Pollich
- Carex erinacea Cav.
- Carex eriocarpa Hausskn. & Kük.
- Carex erythrobasis H.Lév. & Vaniot – red-based leaf sedge
- Carex erythrorrhiza Boeckeler
- Carex erythrovaginata K.A.Ford
- Carex esbirajbhandarii (Rajbh. & H.Ohba) O.Yano
- Carex esenbeckii Kunth
- Carex esquiroliana H.Lév.
- Carex esquirolii H.Lév. & Vaniot
- Carex euprepes Nelmes
- Carex evadens S.González & Reznicek
- Carex × evoluta Hartm.
- Carex excelsa Poepp. ex Kunth
- Carex exilis Dewey
- Carex × exsalina Lepage
- Carex exsiccata L.H.Bailey
- Carex extensa Gooden.

=== F ===
- Carex fangiana X.F.Jin & Y.Y.Zhou
- Carex fargesii Franch.
- Carex fascicularis Sol. ex Boott
- Carex fastigiata Franch.
- Carex fatsuaniana X.F.Jin, Y.F.Lu & Z.C.Lu
- Carex × favratii Christ
- Carex feani F.Br.
- Carex fecunda Steud.
- Carex feddeana H.Pfeiff.
- Carex fedia Nees
- Carex × felixii L.C.Lamb.
- Carex fenghuangshanica F.T.Wang & Tang ex P.C.Li
- Carex × ferdinandi-sauteri Asch. & Graebn.
- Carex fernaldiana H.Lév. & Vaniot
- Carex fernandesiana (Nees ex Boeckeler) J.R.Starr
- Carex fernandezensis Mack. ex G.A.Wheeler
- Carex ferruginea Scop.
- Carex festivelloides Reznicek
- Carex festucacea Willd.
- Carex feta L.H.Bailey
- Carex fibrillosa Franch. & Sav.
- Carex × figertii Asch. & Graebn.
- Carex filamentosa Petrie
- Carex filicina Nees
- Carex filifolia Nutt.
- Carex filipedunculata S.W.Su
- Carex filipes Franch. & Sav. – fishing-rod-like sedge, papillose sedge
- Carex filispica S.R.Zhang
- Carex × filkukae Podp.
- Carex fimbriata Schkuhr
- Carex finitima Boott
- Carex firma Mygind ex Host
- Carex firmicaulis Kalela
- Carex × firmior (Norman) Holmb.
- Carex firmula (Kük.) J.R.Starr
- Carex fischeri K.Schum.
- Carex fissa Mack.
- Carex fissiglumis (C.B.Clarke) S.R.Zhang & O.Yano
- Carex fissirostris Ball
- Carex fissuricola Mack.
- Carex flabellata H.Lév. & Vaniot – flabellate sedge
- Carex flacca Schreb.
- Carex flaccida (S.T.Blake) K.L.Wilson
- Carex flaccosperma Dewey
- Carex flagellifera Colenso
- Carex flava L.
- Carex × flavicans (F.Nyl.) F.Nyl.
- Carex flaviformis Nelmes
- Carex flavocuspis Franch. & Sav.
- Carex flexirostris Reznicek
- Carex floridana Schwein.
- Carex fluviatilis Boott
- Carex foenea Willd.
- Carex foetida All.
- Carex fokienensis Dunn
- Carex foliosissima F.Schmidt
- Carex folliculata L.
- Carex foraminata C.B.Clarke
- Carex foraminatiformis Y.C.Tang & S.Yun Liang
- Carex forficula Franch. & Sav. – scissors-like sedge
- Carex formosa Dewey
- Carex formosensis H.Lév. & Vaniot
- Carex forrestii Kük.
- Carex forsteri Wahlenb.
- Carex fossa G.A.Wheeler
- Carex fracta Mack.
- Carex fragilis Boott
- Carex × fragosoana Pau
- Carex frankii Kunth
- Carex fraseriana Ker Gawl.
- Carex fretalis Hamlin
- Carex × fridtzii Holmb.
- Carex × friesii Blytt
- Carex frigida All.
- Carex fritschii Waisb.
- Carex fructus Reznicek
- Carex fucata Boott ex C.B.Clarke
- Carex fuliginosa Schkuhr – short-leaf sedge
- Carex fulta Franch.
- Carex × fulva Gooden.
- Carex fulvorubescens Hayata
- Carex fumosimontana D.Estes
- Carex × furusei T.Koyama
- Carex furva Webb
- Carex fuscolutea Boeckeler
- Carex fuscula d'Urv.
- Carex fusiformis Nees
- Carex × fussii Simonk.

=== G ===
- Carex gammiei (C.B.Clarke) S.R.Zhang & O.Yano
- Carex gandakiensis Katsuy.
- Carex garberi Fernald
- Carex gaudichaudiana Kunth
- Carex × gaudiniana Guthnick
- Carex gayana Desv.
- Carex gemella Hochst. ex Steud.
- Carex geminata Schkuhr
- Carex genkaiensis Ohwi – Mokpo sedge
- Carex gentilis Franch.
- Carex geographica B.A.Ford & J.R.Starr
- Carex geophila Mack.
- Carex × gerhardtii Figert
- Carex geyeri Boott
- Carex gholsonii Naczi & Cochrane
- Carex gibba Wahlenb. – gibbous sedge
- Carex gibbsiae Rendle
- Carex gibertii G.A.Wheeler
- Carex gifuensis Franch.
- Carex gigantea Rudge
- Carex × ginsiensis Waisb.
- Carex giovanniana Jim.Mejías
- Carex giraldiana Kük.
- Carex giraudiasii H.Lév.
- Carex glabrescens (Kük.) Ohwi – glabrate sedge, hairy forest-live sedge
- Carex glacialis Mack.
- Carex glareosa Schkuhr ex Wahlenb.
- Carex glaucescens Elliott
- Carex glauciformis Meinsh. – pseudo-glaucous sedge
- Carex glaucodea Tuck. ex Olney
- Carex globistylosa P.C.Li
- Carex globosa Boott
- Carex globularis L.
- Carex globulosa Phulphong & D.A.Simpson
- Carex glomerata Thunb.
- Carex glossostigma Hand.-Mazz.
- Carex gmelinii Hook. & Arn. – Gmelin's sedge
- Carex godfreyi Naczi
- Carex goetghebeurii J.R.Starr
- Carex goligongshanensis P.C.Li
- Carex gonggaensis P.C.Li
- Carex gongshanensis Tang & F.T.Wang ex Y.C.Yang
- Carex gordon-grayae Luceño, Márq.-Corro & Sánchez-Villegas
- Carex gotoi Ohwi – two-toothed-beak sedge
- Carex goyenii Petrie
- Carex gracilenta Boott ex Boeckeler
- Carex graciliflora Dunn
- Carex gracilior Mack.
- Carex gracillima Schwein.
- Carex graeffeana Boeckeler
- Carex × grahamii Boott
- Carex grallatoria Maxim.
- Carex graminiculmis T.Koyama
- Carex graminifolia Cherm.
- Carex grandiligulata Kük.
- Carex × grantii A.Benn.
- Carex granularis Muhl. ex Willd.
- Carex gravida L.H.Bailey
- Carex grayi J.Carey
- Carex greenwayi Nelmes
- Carex grioletii Roem. ex Schkuhr
- Carex grisea Wahlenb.
- Carex × groenlandica Lange
- Carex × grossii Fiek
- Carex guatemalensis F.J.Herm.
- Carex guffroyi H.Lév. & H.Perrier
- Carex gunniana Boott
- Carex gynandra Schwein.
- Carex gynodynama Olney
- Carex gypsophila Reznicek & S.González

=== H ===
- Carex hachijoensis Akiyama
- Carex × haematolepis Drejer
- Carex haematopus Jim.Mejías & Roalson
- Carex haematosaccus C.B.Clarke
- Carex haematostoma Nees
- Carex × hageri E.Baumann
- Carex hakkodensis Franch.
- Carex hakonemontana Katsuy.
- Carex hakonensis Franch. & Sav. – small-needle sedge
- Carex halleriana Asso
- Carex halliana L.H.Bailey
- Carex hallii Olney
- Carex × halophila F.Nyl.
- Carex hamata Sw.
- Carex hamlinii K.A.Ford
- Carex hanamninhensis N.K.Khoi
- Carex × hanasakensis T.Koyama
- Carex hancockiana Maxim. – Hancock's sedge
- Carex handel-mazzettii (N.A.Ivanova) S.R.Zhang
- Carex handelii Kük.
- Carex hanensis Dunn
- Carex hangtongensis H.Lév. & Vaniot
- Carex × hanseniana Junge
- Carex hansenii (Lewej. & Lobin) Rivas Mart., Lousã, J.C.Costa & Maria C.Duarte
- Carex harae (Rajbh. & H.Ohba) O.Yano
- Carex harfordii Mack.
- Carex harlandii Boott
- Carex harrysmithii Kük.
- Carex × hartii Dewey
- Carex hartmaniorum A.Cajander
- Carex hashimotoi Ohwi
- Carex hassei L.H.Bailey
- Carex hattoriana Nakai ex Tuyama
- Carex hatuyenensis N.K.Khoi
- Carex haydeniana Olney
- Carex haydenii Dewey
- Carex healyi K.A.Ford
- Carex hebecarpa C.A.Mey.
- Carex hebes Nelmes
- Carex hebetata Boott
- Carex hectorii Petrie
- Carex × helenae Jac.Koopman, Beusekom & Waltje
- Carex heleonastes Ehrh. ex L.f.
- Carex helferi Boeckeler
- Carex helingeeriensis L.Q.Zhao & Jie Yang
- Carex helleri Mack.
- Carex helodes Link
- Carex × helvola Blytt
- Carex hemineuros T.Koyama
- Carex hendersonii L.H.Bailey
- Carex henryi (C.B.Clarke) T.Koyama
- Carex herbacoeli Jim.Mejías & Roalson
- Carex hermannii Cochrane
- Carex herteri G.A.Wheeler
- Carex heshuonensis S.Yun Liang
- Carex heterodoxa Cherm.
- Carex heterolepis Bunge – different-scale sedge
- Carex heteroneura S.Watson
- Carex × heterophyta Holmb.
- Carex heterostachya Bunge – different-spike sedge
- Carex heudesii H.Lév. & Vaniot
- Carex hezhouensis H.Wang & S.N.Wang
- Carex × hibernica A.Benn.
- Carex hilairei Boott
- Carex hilaireioides C.B.Clarke ex Kük.
- Carex hildebrandtiana Boeckeler
- Carex himalaica T.Koyama
- Carex hinnulea C.B.Clarke
- Carex hirsutella Mack.
- Carex hirta L.
- Carex hirtelloides (Kük.) F.T.Wang & Tang ex P.C.Li
- Carex hirticaulis P.C.Li
- Carex hirtifolia Mack.
- Carex hirtifructus Kük.
- Carex hirtigluma C.B.Clarke
- Carex hirtissima W.Boott
- Carex hirtiutriculata L.K.Dai
- Carex hispida Willd. ex Schkuhr
- Carex hitchcockiana Dewey
- Carex hochstetteriana J.Gay ex Seub.
- Carex hohxilensis (R.F.Huang) S.R.Zhang
- Carex hokarsarensis E.U.Haq & Dar
- Carex holmgreniorum Reznicek & D.F.Murray
- Carex holostoma Drejer
- Carex holotricha Ohwi – woolly-scale sedge
- Carex hondoensis Ohwi – Hondo sedge
- Carex honglinii Y.F.Lu & X.F.Jin
- Carex hongnoensis H.Lév.
- Carex hongyuanensis Y.C.Tang & S.Yun Liang
- Carex hoodii Boott
- Carex hookeri Kunth
- Carex hookeriana Dewey
- Carex hoozanensis Hayata
- Carex hopeiensis F.T.Wang & Tang
- Carex hordeistichos Vill.
- Carex horizontalis (Colenso) K.A.Ford
- Carex hormathodes Fernald
- Carex horsfieldii Boott
- Carex × hosoii T.Koyama
- Carex hostiana DC.
- Carex houghtoniana Torr. ex Dewey
- Carex hovarum Cherm.
- Carex huangshanica X.F.Jin & W.J.Chen
- Carex huanjiangensis S.Yun Liang ex Y.F.Lu & X.F.Jin
- Carex huashanica Tang & F.T.Wang ex L.K.Dai
- Carex hubbardii Nelmes
- Carex huehueteca Standl. & Steyerm.
- Carex hughii S.R.Zhang
- Carex hultenii Aspl.
- Carex humahuacaensis G.A.Wheeler
- Carex humbertiana Ohwi – Humbert's sedge
- Carex humbertii Cherm.
- Carex humboldtiana Steud.
- Carex humida Y.L.Chang & Y.L.Yang
- Carex humilis Leyss.
- Carex humpatensis H.E.Hess
- Carex huolushanensis P.C.Li
- Carex husnotiana H.Lév.
- Carex hwangii Matsuda
- Carex hyalina Boott
- Carex hyalinolepis Steud.
- Carex hymenodon Ohwi
- Carex hymenolepis Nees
- Carex hypandra F.Muell. ex Benth.
- Carex hypaneura V.I.Krecz.
- Carex hypochlora Freyn
- Carex hypoleucos É.Desv.
- Carex hypolytroides Ridl.
- Carex hypsipedos C.B.Clarke
- Carex hypsobates Nelmes
- Carex hystericina Muhl. ex Willd.

=== I ===
- Carex idaea Greuter, Matthäs & Risse
- Carex idahoa L.H.Bailey
- Carex idzuroei Franch. & Sav. – small Dickins' sedge
- Carex ignota Dewey
- Carex iljinii V.I.Krecz.
- Carex illegitima Ces.
- Carex illota L.H.Bailey
- Carex × ilseana Ruhmer
- Carex × imandrensis Kihlm. ex Hjelt
- Carex imbecilla K.A.Ford
- Carex imbecillis (Ohwi) Katsuy.
- Carex impexa K.A.Ford
- Carex impressinervia Bryson, Kral & Manhart
- Carex inagawaensis J.Oda & M.N.Tamura
- Carex inanis Kunth
- Carex incisa Boott – digitaria-like sedge
- Carex inclinis Boott ex C.B.Clarke
- Carex incomitata K.R.Thiele
- Carex incurviformis Mack.
- Carex indica L.
- Carex indiciformis F.T.Wang & Tang ex P.C.Li
- Carex indistincta H.Lév. & Vaniot
- Carex indosinica Raymond
- Carex indrakilica Sameer Patil
- Carex infirminervia Naczi
- Carex infuscata Nees
- Carex inopinata V.J.Cook
- Carex inops L.H.Bailey
- Carex insaniae Koidz.
- Carex insignis Boott
- Carex insularis Carmich.
- Carex integra Mack.
- Carex interior L.H.Bailey
- Carex × interjecta Waisb.
- Carex interrupta Boeckeler
- Carex intumescens Rudge
- Carex inversa R.Br.
- Carex inversonervosa Nelmes
- Carex × involuta (Bab.) Syme
- Carex iraqensis S.S.Hooper & Kukkonen
- Carex ischnogyne Gilli
- Carex ischnostachya Steud. – thin-spiculate sedge
- Carex × ishimaensis J.Oda, S.Kinosh. & Nagam.
- Carex ivanoviae T.V.Egorova
- Carex ixtapalucensis Reznicek
- Carex iynx Nelmes

=== J ===
- Carex jacens C.B.Clarke
- Carex jackiana Boott
- Carex jacutica V.I.Krecz.
- Carex × jaegeri F.W.Schultz
- Carex jaluensis Kom. – Amrokgang sedge
- Carex jamesii Schwein.
- Carex jamesonii Boott
- Carex jankowskii Gorodkov
- Carex japonica Thunb. – East Asian sedge
- Carex jeanpertii E.G.Camus
- Carex jianfengensis H.B.Yang, Xiao X.Li & G.D.Liu
- Carex jiaodongensis Y.M.Zhang & X.D.Chen
- Carex jinfoshanensis Tang & F.T.Wang ex S.Y.Liang
- Carex jiuhuaensis S.W.Su
- Carex jizhuangensis S.Yun Liang
- Carex johnstonii Boeckeler
- Carex jonesii L.H.Bailey
- Carex joorii L.H.Bailey
- Carex × josephi-schmittii Raymond
- Carex jubozanensis J.Oda & A.Tanaka
- Carex juniperorum Catling, Reznicek & Crins
- Carex × justi-schmidtii Junge
- Carex juvenilis C.B.Clarke ex E.G.Camus

=== K ===
- Carex kabanovii V.I.Krecz.
- Carex kagoshimensis Tak.Shimizu
- Carex kaloides Petrie
- Carex kanaii (Rajbh. & H.Ohba) S.R.Zhang & O.Yano
- Carex kangdingensis S.R.Zhang
- Carex kansuensis Nelmes
- Carex kaoi Tang & F.T.Wang ex S.Y.Liang
- Carex karashidaniensis Akiyama
- Carex karlongensis Kük.
- Carex karoi Freyn
- Carex kashmirensis C.B.Clarke
- Carex × kattaeana Kük.
- Carex kauaiensis R.W.Krauss
- Carex kelloggii W.Boott
- Carex × kenaica Lepage
- Carex kermadecensis Petrie
- Carex × kernii Jac.Koopman & Więcław
- Carex × ketonensis Akiyama
- Carex khasiana (Jana & V.S.Kumar) Kottaim.
- Carex kiangsuensis Kük.
- Carex killickii Nelmes
- Carex kingii (R.Br. ex Boott) Reznicek
- Carex kiotensis Franch. & Sav.
- Carex kirganica Kom. – seosura sedge, slender-culm thick-nerve sedge
- Carex kirinensis W.Wang & Y.L.Chang
- Carex kirkii Petrie
- Carex kitaibeliana Degen ex Bech.
- Carex klamathensis B.L.Wilson & Janeway
- Carex klaphakei K.L.Wilson
- Carex × kneuckeri P.Fourn.
- Carex × knieskernii Dewey
- Carex knorringiae Kük. ex V.I.Krecz.
- Carex kobomugi Ohwi – Asian sand sedge
- Carex kobresioidea (Kük.) S.R.Zhang
- Carex koestlinii Hochst. ex Steud.
- Carex × kohtsii K.Richt.
- Carex kokanica (Regel) S.R.Zhang
- Carex korkischkoae A.E.Kozhevn.
- Carex korshinskyi Kom. – Korshinsky's sedge
- Carex koshewnikowii Litv.
- Carex kotagirica Maji & V.P.Prasad
- Carex koyaensis J.Oda & Nagam.
- Carex × krajinae Domin
- Carex kraliana Naczi & Bryson
- Carex krascheninnikovii Kom. ex V.I.Krecz.
- Carex krauseorum Boeckeler
- Carex kreczetoviczii T.V.Egorova
- Carex kuchunensis Tang & F.T.Wang ex S.Y.Liang
- Carex kucyniakii Raymond
- Carex × kuekenthaliana Appel & A.Brückn.
- Carex × kuekenthalii Dörfl. ex Zahn
- Carex kujuzana Ohwi – Jangseong sedge
- Carex kukkoneniana Luceño & Martín-Bravo
- Carex kulingana L.H.Bailey
- Carex kumaonensis Kük.
- Carex kunlunsanensis N.R.Cui
- Carex kurdica Kük. ex Hand.-Mazz.
- Carex × kurilensis Ohwi
- Carex × kurogii K.T.Takah. & M.N.Tamura
- Carex kuzakaiensis (M.Kikuchi) K.T.Takah. & M.N.Tamura
- Carex kwangsiensis F.T.Wang & Tang ex P.C.Li
- Carex × kyyhkynenii Hiitonen

=== L ===
- Carex lachenalii Schkuhr – two-tip sedge
- Carex lacistoma R.Br.
- Carex × lackowitziana Aug.R.Paul
- Carex lacustris Willd.
- Carex laegaardii J.R.Starr
- Carex laeta Boott
- Carex laevicaulis Hochst. ex Seub.
- Carex laeviconica Dewey
- Carex laeviculmis Meinsh.
- Carex laevigata Sm.
- Carex laevissima Nakai – small nerved-fruit sedge
- Carex laevivaginata (Kük.) Mack.
- Carex lageniformis Nelmes
- Carex × laggeri Wimm.
- Carex lagunensis M.E.Jones
- Carex lainzii Luceño, E.Rico & T.Romero
- Carex lambertiana Boott
- Carex lamprocarpa Phil.
- Carex lamprochlamys S.T.Blake
- Carex lancangensis S.Yun Liang
- Carex lancea (Thunb.) Baill.
- Carex lanceisquama (Hand.-Mazz.) V.I.Krecz.
- Carex lanceolata Boott – lanceolate sedge
- Carex lancifolia C.B.Clarke
- Carex lancisquamata L.K.Dai
- Carex × langeana Fernald
- Carex × langii Steud.
- Carex lankana T.Koyama
- Carex laosensis Nelmes
- Carex lapazensis C.B.Clarke
- Carex lapponica O.Lang
- Carex larensis Steyerm.
- Carex laricetorum Y.L.Chou
- Carex lasiocarpa Ehrh. – woolly-fruit sedge
- Carex lasiolepis Franch.
- Carex latebracteata Waterf.
- Carex latisquamea Kom. – woolly-leaf sedge
- Carex lativena S.D.Jones & G.D.Jones
- Carex × lausii Podp.
- Carex laxa Wahlenb. – loosely-spike sedge
- Carex laxiculmis Schwein.
- Carex laxiflora Lam.
- Carex lazarei Jac.Koopman, Niketić, Wieclaw & Govaerts
- Carex leavenworthii Dewey
- Carex lechleriana (Steud.) J.R.Starr
- Carex lectissima K.A.Ford
- Carex ledebouriana C.A.Mey. ex Trevir.
- Carex ledongensis H.B.Yang & G.D.Liu
- Carex leersii F.W.Schultz
- Carex lehmannii Drejer – Lehman's sedge
- Carex leiorhyncha C.A.Mey. – mountain cat-tail sedge
- Carex lemanniana Boott
- Carex lemmonii W.Boott
- Carex lenta D.Don – sluggish sedge
- Carex lenticularis Michx.
- Carex lepida Boott
- Carex lepidocarpa Tausch
- Carex lepidochlamys (F.T.Wang & Tang ex P.C.Li) S.R.Zhang
- Carex leporina L.
- Carex leporinella Mack.
- Carex leptalea Wahlenb.
- Carex × leptoblasta Holmb.
- Carex leptogyna T.Koyama
- Carex leptonervia (Fernald) Fernald
- Carex leptopoda Mack.
- Carex lessoniana Steud.
- Carex leucantha Arn. ex Boott
- Carex leucochlora Bunge
- Carex × leutzii Kneuck.
- Carex leviosa Míguez, Jim.Mejías, H.Schaef. & Martín-Bravo
- Carex liangiana X.F.Jin & Y.F.Lu
- Carex liangshanensis S.R.Zhang
- Carex libera (Kük.) Hamlin
- Carex × lidii Hadac
- Carex ligata Boott
- Carex × ligniciensis Figert
- Carex ligulata Nees – ligulate sedge
- Carex × limnicola H.Gross
- Carex × limnogena Appel
- Carex limosa L. – mud sedge
- Carex limprichtiana Kük.
- Carex × limula Fr.
- Carex lindleyana Nees
- Carex lingii F.T.Wang & Tang
- Carex liouana F.T.Wang & Tang
- Carex liparocarpos Gaudin
- Carex lithophila Turcz. – rock-loving sedge
- Carex litorhyncha Franch.
- Carex litorosa L.H.Bailey
- Carex littledalei (C.B.Clarke) S.R.Zhang
- Carex litvinovii Kük.
- Carex liui T.Koyama & T.I.Chuang
- Carex livida (Wahlenb.) Willd. – livid sedge
- Carex lobolepis F.Muell.
- Carex lobulirostris Drejer
- Carex loliacea L. – ryegrass sedge
- Carex lonchocarpa Willd. ex Spreng.
- Carex lonchophora Ohwi
- Carex longebrachiata Boeckeler
- Carex longerostrata C.A.Mey.
- Carex longhiensis Franch.
- Carex longicaulis Boeckeler
- Carex longicolla Tang & F.T.Wang ex Y.F.Deng
- Carex longicruris Nees
- Carex longiculmis Petrie
- Carex longicuspis Boeckeler
- Carex longifructus (Kük.) K.A.Ford
- Carex longii Mack.
- Carex longiligula Reznicek & S.González
- Carex longipes D.Don
- Carex longipetiolata Qing L.Wang, H.B.Yang & Y.F.Deng
- Carex longispiculata Y.C.Yang
- Carex longissima M.E.Jones
- Carex longpanlaensis S.Yun Liang
- Carex longshengensis Y.C.Tang & S.Yun Liang
- Carex lophocarpa C.B.Clarke
- Carex × loretii Rouy
- Carex louisianica L.H.Bailey
- Carex lowei Bech.
- Carex lucennoiberica Maguilla & M.Escudero
- Carex lucorum Willd.
- Carex luctuosa Franch.
- Carex × ludibunda J.Gay
- Carex ludwigii (Hochst.) Luceño & Martín-Bravo
- Carex lupuliformis Sartwell ex Dewey
- Carex lupulina Muhl. ex Willd.
- Carex lurida Wahlenb.
- Carex luridiformis Mack. ex Reznicek & S.González
- Carex lushanensis Kük.
- Carex lutea LeBlond
- Carex × luteola (Rchb.) Sendtn.
- Carex luzulifolia W.Boott
- Carex luzulina Olney
- Carex lycurus K.Schum.
- Carex lyngbyei Hornem. – Lyngbye's sedge

=== M ===
- Carex maackii Maxim. – Maack's sedge
- Carex mabilliana (Rouy) Prain
- Carex × macilenta F.Nyl.
- Carex mackenziana Weath.
- Carex mackenziei V.I.Krecz. – Mackenzie's sedge
- Carex macloviana d'Urv.
- Carex macloviformis (G.A.Wheeler) J.R.Starr
- Carex × macounii Dewey
- Carex macrocephala Willd. ex Spreng.
- Carex macrochaeta C.A.Mey.
- Carex macroglossa Franch. & Sav.
- Carex macrolepis DC.
- Carex macrophyllidion Nelmes
- Carex macroprophylla (Y.C.Yang) S.R.Zhang
- Carex macrorrhiza Boeckeler
- Carex macrosolen Steud.
- Carex macrostachys Bertol.
- Carex macrostigmatica Kük.
- Carex macrostylos Lapeyr.
- Carex macrotrichoides J.R.Starr
- Carex maculata Boott – maculate sedge
- Carex madagascariensis Boeckeler
- Carex madida J.R.Starr
- Carex madrensis L.H.Bailey
- Carex magacis Molina Gonz., Acedo & Llamas
- Carex magellanica Lam.
- Carex magnoutriculata Tang & F.T.Wang ex L.K.Dai
- Carex × mainensis Porter
- Carex mairei Coss. & Germ.
- Carex makinoensis Franch. – tufted rock-living sedge
- Carex makuensis P.C.Li
- Carex malaccensis C.B.Clarke
- Carex malipoensis Yuan Y.Li & H.Peng
- Carex mallae (Rajbh. & H.Ohba) O.Yano
- Carex malmei Kalela
- Carex malyschevii T.V.Egorova
- Carex manca Boott
- Carex manciformis C.B.Clarke ex Franch.
- Carex mandoniana Boeckeler
- Carex mandshurica Meinsh. – Manchurian sedge
- Carex manginii E.G.Camus
- Carex manhartii Bryson
- Carex mannii E.A.Bruce
- Carex maolanensis Y.F.Deng & Xi X.Zhang
- Carex maorica Hamlin
- Carex maorshanica Y.L.Chou
- Carex maquensis Y.C.Yang
- Carex marahuacana Reznicek
- Carex marianensis Stacey
- Carex marina Dewey
- Carex mariposana L.H.Bailey ex Mack.
- Carex maritima Gunnerus
- Carex markgrafii Kük.
- Carex × marshallii A.Benn.
- Carex martynenkoi Zolot.
- Carex × massonii Cay. & Lepage
- Carex matsumurae Franch. – big-wheat sedge
- Carex maubertiana Boott
- Carex maximowiczii Miq. – Maximowicz's sedge
- Carex mayebarana Ohwi
- Carex mckittrickensis P.W.Ball
- Carex mcvaughii Reznicek
- Carex meadii Dewey
- Carex media R.Br.
- Carex meeboldiana Kük.
- Carex megalepis K.A.Ford
- Carex meihsienica K.T.Fu
- Carex meiocarpa H.Lév. & Vaniot
- Carex melanantha C.A.Mey.
- Carex melananthiformis Litv.
- Carex melanocarpa Cham. ex Trautv.
- Carex melanocephala Turcz.
- Carex melanocystis É.Desv.
- Carex melanorrhyncha Nelmes
- Carex melanosperma Liebm.
- Carex melanostachya M.Bieb. ex Willd.
- Carex melinacra Franch.
- Carex membranacea Hook.
- Carex × mendica Lepage
- Carex mendocinensis Olney ex Boott
- Carex meridensis (Steyerm.) J.R.Starr
- Carex meridionalis (Kük.) Herter
- Carex merritt-fernaldii Mack.
- Carex mertensii J.D.Prescott ex Bong.
- Carex merxmuelleri Podlech
- Carex mesochorea Mack.
- Carex mesophila Reznicek & S.González
- Carex metallica H.Lév. – white-spike sedge
- Carex meyenii Nees
- Carex meyeriana Kunth – Meyer's sedge
- Carex michauxiana Boeckeler
- Carex michelii Host
- Carex michoacana Reznicek, Hipp & S.González
- Carex micrantha Kük. – small-flower sedge
- Carex microcarpa Bertol. ex Moris
- Carex microchaeta Holm
- Carex microdonta Torr.
- Carex microglochin Wahlenb.
- Carex micropoda C.A.Mey.
- Carex microptera Mack.
- Carex microrhyncha Mack.
- Carex × microstachya Ehrh.
- Carex × microstyla J.Gay ex Gaudin
- Carex microtricha Franch.
- Carex middendorffii F.Schmidt
- Carex mildbraediana Kük.
- Carex miliaris Michx.
- Carex millsii Dunn
- Carex mingrelica Kük.
- Carex minor (Kük.) K.A.Ford
- Carex minutiscabra Kük. ex V.I.Krecz.
- Carex minutissima Barros
- Carex minxianensis S.Yun Liang
- Carex minxianica Y.C.Yang
- Carex mira Kük. – remarkable sedge
- Carex misera Buckley
- Carex missouriensis P.Rothr. & Reznicek
- Carex mitchelliana M.A.Curtis
- Carex × mithala Callmé
- Carex mitrata Franch. – mitra sedge
- Carex miyabei Franch.
- Carex mochomuensis Katsuy.
- Carex modesti M.Escudero, Martín-Bravo & Jim.Mejías
- Carex moesta Kunth
- Carex molesta Mack.
- Carex molestiformis Reznicek & Rothrock
- Carex molinae Phil.
- Carex mollicula Boott – small mucronate sedge
- Carex mollissima Christ ex Scheutz – softest sedge
- Carex monodynama (Griseb.) G.A.Wheeler
- Carex monostachya A.Rich.
- Carex monotropa Nelmes
- Carex montana L.
- Carex × montanoaltaica Zolot.
- Carex montis-eeka Hillebr.
- Carex montis-everestii Kük.
- Carex montis-wutaii T.Koyama
- Carex moorcroftii Falc. ex Boott
- Carex moorei G.A.Wheeler
- Carex × moravica Repka & Rolecek
- Carex morii Hayata
- Carex × moriyoshiensis Fujiw. & Y.Matsuda
- Carex morrowii Boott
- Carex mosoynensis Franch.
- Carex motuoensis Y.C.Yang
- Carex moupinensis Franch.
- Carex mucronata All.
- Carex mucronatiformis Tang & F.T.Wang ex S.Yun Liang
- Carex × mucronulata Holmb.
- Carex muehlenbergii Schkuhr ex Willd.
- Carex muelleri Petrie
- Carex × muelleriana F.W.Schultz
- Carex muliensis Hand.-Mazz.
- Carex multicaulis L.H.Bailey
- Carex multicostata Mack.
- Carex multifaria (Nees ex Boott) J.R.Starr
- Carex multifolia Ohwi
- Carex multispicata Kunze
- Carex multispiculata Luceño & Martín-Bravo
- Carex munda Boott
- Carex munipoorensis C.B.Clarke
- Carex munroi Boott ex C.B.Clarke
- Carex muricata L.
- Carex muriculata F.J.Herm.
- Carex × musashiensis Ohwi
- Carex musei Steud.
- Carex muskingumensis Schwein.
- Carex myosuroides Vill.
- Carex myosurus Nees

=== N ===
- Carex nachiana Ohwi
- Carex nairii Ghildyal & U.C.Bhattach.
- Carex nakaoana T.Koyama
- Carex nakasimae Ohwi
- Carex nanchuanensis K.L.Chu ex S.Y.Liang
- Carex nandadeviensis Ghildyal, U.C.Bhattach. & Hajra
- Carex nangtciangensis Pamp.
- Carex nanpingensis X.F.Jin
- Carex nardina (Hornem.) Fr.
- Carex nasuensis K.T.Takah., T.Nog. & M.N.Tamura
- Carex nealiae R.W.Krauss
- Carex neblinensis Reznicek
- Carex nebrascensis Dewey
- Carex nebularum Phil.
- Carex neesiana Endl.
- Carex negeri (Kük.) J.R.Starr
- Carex negrii Chiov.
- Carex nelmesiana Barros
- Carex nelsonii Mack.
- Carex nemoralis (K.L.Wilson) K.L.Wilson
- Carex nemostachys Steud.
- Carex nemurensis Franch.
- Carex × neobigelowii Lepage
- Carex neochevalieri Kük. ex A.Chev.
- Carex neodigyna P.C.Li
- Carex × neofilipendula Lepage
- Carex neoguinensis C.B.Clarke
- Carex neohebridensis Guillaumin & Kük.
- Carex × neomiliaris Lepage
- Carex neopetelotii Raymond
- Carex neopolycephala Tang & F.T.Wang ex L.K.Dai
- Carex × neorigida Lepage
- Carex nervata Franch. & Sav. – nerved-mitra sedge
- Carex nervina L.H.Bailey
- Carex neurocarpa Maxim. – nerved-fruit sedge
- Carex neurophora Mack.
- Carex × nicoloffii Pamp.
- Carex niederleiniana Boeckeler
- Carex nigerrima Nelmes
- Carex nigra (L.) Reichard
- Carex nigricans C.A.Mey.
- Carex nigromarginata Schwein.
- Carex × nikaii T.Koyama
- Carex nikolskensis Kom.
- Carex nipposinica Ohwi
- Carex nivalis Boott
- Carex nodaeana A.I.Baranov & Skvortsov
- Carex nodiflora Boeckeler
- Carex nodosa S.R.Zhang, J.Zhang, Z.Y.Liu, S.Qu & R.G.Han
- Carex noguchii J.Oda & Nagam.
- Carex noltiei S.R.Zhang
- Carex nordica Molina Gonz., Acedo & Llamas
- Carex normalis Mack.
- Carex norvegica Retz. – Norway sedge
- Carex notha Kunth
- Carex × notholimosioides Doweld
- Carex nova L.H.Bailey
- Carex novae-angliae Schwein.
- Carex novogaliciana Reznicek
- Carex nubigena D.Don
- Carex nudata W.Boott
- Carex nudicarpa (Y.C.Yang) S.R.Zhang

=== O ===
- Carex × oberrodensis B.Walln.
- Carex obispoensis Stacey
- Carex oblanceolata T.Koyama
- Carex obliquicarpa X.F.Jin, C.Z.Zheng & B.Y.Ding
- Carex obliquitruncata Y.C.Tang & S.Yun Liang
- Carex obnupta L.H.Bailey
- Carex obovatosquamata F.T.Wang & Y.L.Chang ex P.C.Li
- Carex obscura Nees
- Carex obscuriceps Kük.
- Carex obtusata Lilj.
- Carex obtusifolia (Heenan) K.A.Ford
- Carex occidentalis L.H.Bailey
- Carex ochrochlamys Ohwi – yellow-mantle sedge
- Carex ochrosaccus (C.B.Clarke) Hamlin
- Carex odontolepis Phil.
- Carex odontostoma Kük.
- Carex oederi Retz.
- Carex oedipostyla Duval-Jouve
- Carex × oenensis A.Neumann ex B.Walln.
- Carex × ohmuelleriana O.Lang
- Carex okamotoi Ohwi – creeping narrow-leaf sedge
- Carex oklahomensis Mack.
- Carex okuboi Franch.
- Carex olbiensis Jord.
- Carex oligantha Steud.
- Carex oligocarpa Willd.
- Carex oligocarya C.B.Clarke
- Carex oligosperma Michx.
- Carex oligostachya Nees
- Carex olivacea Boott
- Carex olivieri H.Lév.
- Carex × olneyi Boott
- Carex omeiensis Tang
- Carex omeyica Molina Gonz., Acedo & Llamas
- Carex omiana Franch. & Sav. – Suwon sedge
- Carex omurae T.Koyama
- Carex × oneillii Lepage
- Carex onoei Franch. & Sav. – needle sedge
- Carex opaca (F.J.Herm.) P.Rothr. & Reznicek
- Carex ophiolithica Heenan & de Lange
- Carex orbicularinucis L.K.Dai
- Carex orbicularis Boott
- Carex oreocharis Holm
- Carex oreophila C.A.Mey.
- Carex orestera Zika
- Carex orizabae Liebm.
- Carex ormostachya Wiegand
- Carex ornithopoda Willd.
- Carex oronensis Fernald
- Carex orothanatica Lois, Acedo, Reznicek & Jim.Mejías
- Carex orthostemon Hayata
- Carex oshimensis Nakai
- Carex otaruensis Franch.
- Carex otayae Ohwi
- Carex otomana Molina Gonz., Acedo & Llamas
- Carex otrubae Podp.
- Carex ouachitana Kral, Manhart & Bryson
- Carex ovatispiculata F.T.Wang & Y.L.Chang ex S.Yun Liang
- Carex ovoidispica O.Yano
- Carex ovoidoconica Ohwi
- Carex ownbeyi G.A.Wheeler
- Carex oxyandra (Franch. & Sav.) Kudô – hill sedge
- Carex oxylepis Torr. & Hook.
- Carex oxyphylla Franch.
- Carex ozarkana P.Rothr. & Reznicek

=== P ===
- Carex pachamamae Jim.-Mejías & Reznicek
- Carex pachycarpa Mack.
- Carex pachygyna Franch. & Sav.
- Carex pachyneura Kitag.
- Carex pachystachya Cham. ex Steud.
- Carex pachystylis J.Gay
- Carex × paczoskii Zapał.
- Carex paeninsulae Naczi, E.L.Bridges & Orzell
- Carex pairae F.W.Schultz
- Carex palawanensis Kük.
- Carex paleacea Schreb. ex Wahlenb.
- Carex pallescens L.
- Carex pallidula Harmaja
- Carex × paludivagans W.H.Drury
- Carex pamirensis C.B.Clarke
- Carex pandanophylla C.B.Clarke
- Carex panduranganii Kalidass
- Carex paneroi Reznicek & S.González
- Carex panicea L.
- Carex paniculata L.
- Carex panormitana Guss.
- Carex pansa L.H.Bailey
- Carex papillosissima Nelmes
- Carex × paponii Muret ex T.Durand & Pittier
- Carex papualpina K.L.Wilson
- Carex papulosa Boott
- Carex paracheniana X.F.Jin, D.A.Simpson & C.Z.Zheng
- Carex paracuraica F.T.Wang & Y.L.Chang ex S.Yun Liang
- Carex parallela (Laest.) Sommerf.
- Carex paramjitii (Jana, Noltie, R.C.Srivast. & A.Mukh.) O.Yano
- Carex pararadicalis X.F.Jin & J.M.Cen
- Carex paratatsiensis Y.F.Lu & X.F.Jin
- Carex parciflora Boott
- Carex × parentii Jac.Koopman, Beusekom & Więcław
- Carex parryana Dewey
- Carex parva Nees
- Carex parviflora Host
- Carex parvigluma C.B.Clarke
- Carex parvirufa Luceño & Márq.-Corro
- Carex parvispica K.A.Ford
- Carex parvula O.Yano
- Carex patagonica Speg.
- Carex × patuensis Lepage
- Carex pauciflora Lightf. – few-flower sedge
- Carex paui Sennen
- Carex × pauliana F.W.Schultz
- Carex × paulii Asch. & Graebn.
- Carex paulo-vargasii Luceño & Marín
- Carex paxii Kük. – Pax's sedge
- Carex × payettei J.Cay.
- Carex paysonis Clokey
- Carex peckii Howe
- Carex pedicularis Jim.Mejías & Naczi
- Carex pediformis C.A.Mey. – wide-leaf low sedge
- Carex pedunculata Muhl. ex Willd.
- Carex peichuniana S.R.Zhang
- Carex peiktusani Kom. – Baekdu sedge
- Carex peliosanthifolia F.T.Wang & Tang ex P.C.Li
- Carex pellita Muhl. ex Willd.
- Carex pelocarpa F.J.Herm.
- Carex penalpina K.A.Ford
- Carex pendula Huds.
- Carex penduliformis Cherm.
- Carex pengii X.F.Jin & C.Z.Zheng
- Carex pensylvanica Lam.
- Carex perakensis C.B.Clarke
- Carex percostata F.J.Herm.
- Carex perdensa (Kukkonen) Luceño & Martín-Bravo
- Carex perdentata S.D.Jones
- Carex peregrina Link
- Carex perglobosa Mack.
- Carex pergracilis Nelmes
- Carex perlonga Fernald
- Carex perplexa (Heenan & de Lange) K.A.Ford
- Carex perprava C.B.Clarke
- Carex perraudieriana (Kük. ex Bornm.) Gay ex Kük.
- Carex × persalina Lepage
- Carex persistens Ohwi
- Carex pertenuis L.H.Bailey
- Carex peruviana J.Presl & C.Presl
- Carex petasata Dewey
- Carex petelotii Gross
- Carex petitiana A.Rich.
- Carex petricosa Dewey
- Carex petriei Cheeseman
- Carex peucophila Holm
- Carex phacota Spreng. – lentoid sedge
- Carex phaenocarpa Franch.
- Carex phaeocephala Piper
- Carex phaeodon T.Koyama
- Carex phaeothrix Ohwi – brown-spike sedge
- Carex phalaroides Kunth
- Carex phankei N.K.Khoi
- Carex phleoides Cav.
- Carex phoenicis Dunn
- Carex phragmitoides Kük.
- Carex phyllocaula Nelmes
- Carex phyllocephala T.Koyama
- Carex phylloscirpoides Saldivia, S.Gebauer, Martín-Bravo & Jim.Mejías
- Carex phyllostachys C.A.Mey.
- Carex × physocarpoides Lepage
- Carex physodes M.Bieb.
- Carex pichinchensis Kunth
- Carex picta Steud.
- Carex pigra Naczi
- Carex pilosa Scop. – pilose-leaf sedge
- Carex × pilosiuscula Gobi
- Carex pilulifera L.
- Carex pingleensis Z.C.Lu, Y.F.Lu & X.F.Jin
- Carex pinophila Reznicek & S.González
- Carex pisanoi G.A.Wheeler
- Carex pisiformis Boott – thread sedge, Sakhalin mitra sedge, alternate-flower thread sedge
- Carex pityophila Mack.
- Carex planata Franch. & Sav.
- Carex planiculmis Kom. – shady mucronate sedge
- Carex planilamina Reznicek & S.González
- Carex planiscapa Chun & F.C.How
- Carex planispicata Naczi
- Carex planostachys Kunze
- Carex plantaginea Lam.
- Carex platyphylla J.Carey
- Carex platysperma Y.L.Chang & Y.L.Yang
- Carex plectobasis V.I.Krecz.
- Carex plectocarpa F.J.Herm.
- Carex pleioneura G.A.Wheeler
- Carex pleiostachys C.B.Clarke
- Carex pleurocaula Nelmes
- Carex × ploegii Jac.Koopman
- Carex × ploettneriana Beyer
- Carex pluriflora Hultén
- Carex plurinervata J.R.Starr
- Carex poculisquama Kük. – bowl-shape-scale sedge
- Carex podocarpa R.Br.
- Carex podogyna Franch. & Sav.
- Carex poeppigii C.B.Clarke ex G.A.Wheeler
- Carex poilanei Raymond
- Carex polyantha F.Muell.
- Carex polycephala Boott
- Carex polymascula P.C.Li
- Carex polymorpha Muhl.
- Carex polyphylla Kar. & Kir.
- Carex polyschoena H.Lév. & Vaniot
- Carex polyschoenoides K.T.Fu
- Carex polystachya Sw. ex Wahlenb.
- Carex polysticha Boeckeler
- Carex pontica Albov
- Carex popovii V.I.Krecz.
- Carex porrecta Reznicek & Camelb.
- Carex potens K.A.Ford
- Carex potosina Hemsl.
- Carex praeceptorum Mack.
- Carex praeclara Nelmes
- Carex praecox Schreb.
- Carex praegracilis W.Boott
- Carex praelonga C.B.Clarke
- Carex × prahliana Junge
- Carex prainii Kük.
- Carex prairea Dewey ex Alph.Wood
- Carex prasina Wahlenb.
- Carex praticola Rydb.
- Carex preissii Nees
- Carex prescottiana Boott
- Carex preslii Steud.
- Carex pringlei L.H.Bailey
- Carex procumbens H.B.Yang, Xiao X.Li & G.D.Liu
- Carex projecta Mack.
- Carex × prolixa Fr.
- Carex prolongata Kük.
- Carex proposita Mack.
- Carex × prostii Chass. ex P.Fourn.
- Carex provotii Franch.
- Carex proxima Cherm.
- Carex pruinosa Boott
- Carex przewalskii T.V.Egorova
- Carex pseudoaperta Boeckeler ex Kük.
- Carex pseudoaphanolepis Ohwi
- Carex pseudobicolor Boeckeler
- Carex pseudobrizoides Clavaud
- Carex pseudochinensis H.Lév. & Vaniot – false Chinese sedge
- Carex pseudocuraica F.Schmidt – creeper-like sedge
- Carex pseudocyperus L.
- Carex pseudodahurica A.P.Khokhr.
- Carex pseudodispalata K.T.Fu
- Carex pseudofoetida Kük.
- Carex pseudogammiei S.R.Zhang
- Carex × pseudohelvola Kihlm.
- Carex pseudohumilis F.T.Wang & Y.L.Chang ex P.C.Li
- Carex pseudohypochlora Y.L.Chang & Y.L.Yang
- Carex pseudolaticeps Tang & F.T.Wang ex S.Y.Liang
- Carex pseudolaxa (C.B.Clarke) O.Yano & S.R.Zhang
- Carex pseudoligulata L.K.Dai
- Carex pseudololiacea F.Schmidt
- Carex pseudomacloviana G.A.Wheeler
- Carex × pseudomairei E.G.Camus
- Carex pseudomitrata X.F.Jin & J.M.Cen
- Carex pseudophyllocephala L.K.Dai
- Carex pseudorufa Luceño & Martín-Bravo
- Carex pseudosadoensis Akiyama
- Carex pseudospachiana H.Lév. & Vaniot
- Carex pseudosupina Y.C.Tang ex L.K.Dai
- Carex pseudotristachya X.F.Jin & C.Z.Zheng
- Carex × pseudovulpina K.Richt.
- Carex pseuduncinoides (Noltie) O.Yano & S.R.Zhang
- Carex psychrophila Nees
- Carex pterocarpa Petrie
- Carex pterocaulos Nelmes
- Carex puberuliutriculata Y.F.Lu & X.F.Jin
- Carex pubigluma Reznicek
- Carex pudica Honda
- Carex pulchra Boott
- Carex pulchrifolia A.E.Kozhevn.
- Carex pulicaris L.
- Carex pumila Thunb. – dwarf sand sedge
- Carex punctata Gaudin
- Carex pungens Boeckeler
- Carex punicea K.A.Ford
- Carex punicola D.B.Poind., Jim.Mejías & M.Escudero
- Carex purdiei Boott
- Carex purpleovaginalis Q.S.Wang
- Carex purpurata (Petrie) K.A.Ford
- Carex purpureosquamata L.K.Dai
- Carex purpureovagina F.T.Wang & Y.L.Chang ex S.Yun Liang
- Carex purpureovaginata Boeckeler
- Carex purpurifera Mack.
- Carex × putjatini Kom.
- Carex pycnostachya Kar. & Kir.
- Carex pygmaea Boeckeler
- Carex pyramidalis Kük.
- Carex pyrenaica Wahlenb.

=== Q ===
- Carex qinghaiensis Y.C.Yang
- Carex qingliangensis D.M.Weng, H.W.Zhang & S.F.Xu
- Carex qingyangensis S.W.Su & S.M.Xu
- Carex qiyunensis S.W.Su & S.M.Xu
- Carex quadriflora (Kük.) Ohwi – four-flower sedge
- Carex × quebecensis Lepage
- Carex queretarensis Reznicek & S.González
- Carex quichensis F.J.Herm.
- Carex quinquin Jim.Mejías & Dorr
- Carex × quirponensis Fernald
- Carex quixotiana Ben.Benítez, Martín-Bravo, Luceño & Jim.Mejías

=== R ===
- Carex × raciborskii Zapał.
- Carex raddei Kük. – Radde's sedge
- Carex radfordii Gaddy
- Carex radiata (Wahlenb.) Small
- Carex radicalis Boott
- Carex radicalispicula Tang & F.T.Wang ex Y.F.Lu & X.F.Jin
- Carex radiciflora Dunn
- Carex radicina Z.P.Wang
- Carex rafflesiana Boott
- Carex rainbowii Luceño, Jim.Mejías, M.Escudero & Martín-Bravo
- Carex raleighii Nelmes
- Carex ramenskii Kom.
- Carex ramentaceofructus K.T.Fu
- Carex ramosa Willd.
- Carex ramosii Kük.
- Carex randalpina B.Walln.
- Carex raoulii Boott
- Carex rapaensis (H.St.John) K.L.Wilson
- Carex raphidocarpa Nees
- Carex rara Boott – pine-leaf sedge
- Carex rariflora (Wahlenb.) Sm.
- Carex ratongensis (C.B.Clarke) C.B.Clarke
- Carex raynoldsii Dewey
- Carex rcsrivastavae (Jana) Roalson
- Carex recta Boott
- Carex × reducta Drejer
- Carex regeliana (Kük.) Litv.
- Carex regnelliana Boeckeler
- Carex reicheana Boeckeler
- Carex reichei Kük.
- Carex × reichgeltii Jac.Koopman, Wieclaw & Waltje
- Carex reinii Franch. & Sav.
- Carex relaxa V.I.Krecz.
- Carex remota L.
- Carex remotistachya Y.Y.Zhou & X.F.Jin
- Carex remotiuscula Wahlenb. – minute-gibbous sedge
- Carex renauldii H.Lév.
- Carex reniformis (L.H.Bailey) Small
- Carex renschiana Boeckeler
- Carex repanda C.B.Clarke
- Carex repens Bellardi
- Carex reptabunda (Trautv.) V.I.Krecz.
- Carex resectans Cheeseman
- Carex retroflexa Muhl. ex Willd.
- Carex retrofracta Kük.
- Carex retrorsa Schwein.
- Carex reuteriana Boiss.
- Carex revoluta Reznicek & S.González
- Carex reznicekii Werier
- Carex rhizina Blytt ex Lindblom
- Carex rhizopoda Maxim.
- Carex rhodesiaca Nelmes
- Carex rhomalea (Fernald) Mack.
- Carex rhombifructus Ohwi
- Carex rhynchachaenium C.B.Clarke
- Carex rhynchoperigynium S.D.Jones & Reznicek
- Carex rhynchophora Franch.
- Carex richardsonii R.Br.
- Carex ridongensis P.C.Li
- Carex × rieseana Figert
- Carex rigidioides (Gorodkov) V.I.Krecz.
- Carex × rikuchiuensis Akiyama
- Carex riloensis Stoeva & E.D.Popova
- Carex riparia Curtis
- Carex rivulorum Dunn
- Carex roalsoniana Jim.Mejías & M.Escudero
- Carex roanensis F.J.Herm.
- Carex rochebrunei Franch. & Sav.
- Carex rongkupiorum Sameer Patil
- Carex roraimensis Steyerm.
- Carex rorulenta Porta
- Carex rosea Willd.
- Carex × rossiana Degen
- Carex rossii Boott
- Carex rostellifera Y.L.Chang & Y.L.Yang
- Carex rostrata Stokes – beak sedge
- Carex × rotae De Not.
- Carex rotundata Wahlenb. – round sedge
- Carex rouyana Franch.
- Carex rubicunda Petrie
- Carex rubrobrunnea C.B.Clarke
- Carex × rubrovaginata (Hamlin) K.A.Ford
- Carex × ruedtii Kneuck.
- Carex rufina Drejer
- Carex rufulistolon T.Koyama
- Carex rugata Ohwi
- Carex rugulosa Kük. – thick-nerve sedge
- Carex runssoroensis K.Schum.
- Carex rupestris All. – curly sedge
- Carex rupicola (Pedersen) G.A.Wheeler
- Carex ruralis J.Oda & Nagam.
- Carex rutenbergiana Boeckeler
- Carex ruthii Mack.
- Carex ruthsatziae G.A.Wheeler
- Carex rzedowskii Reznicek & S.González

=== S ===
- Carex × saamica A.T.M.Pedersen & Elven
- Carex sabulosa Turcz. ex Kunth
- Carex sabynensis Less. ex Kunth
- Carex sacerdotis Nelmes
- Carex sachalinensis F.Schmidt
- Carex sacrosancta Honda
- Carex sadoensis Franch.
- Carex sagaensis Y.C.Yang
- Carex sagei Phil.
- Carex sahnii Ghildyal & U.C.Bhattach.
- Carex sajanensis V.I.Krecz.
- Carex × sakaguchii Ohwi
- Carex salina Wahlenb.
- Carex × salisiana Brügger
- Carex saltaensis Gross
- Carex salticola J.R.Starr
- Carex sambiranensis (H.Lév.) Cherm.
- Carex samoensis Boeckeler
- Carex sampsonii Hance
- Carex sanctae-marthae L.E.Mora & J.O.Rangel
- Carex sanguinea Boott
- Carex × sanionis K.Richt.
- Carex sanjappae Bhaumik & M.K.Pathak
- Carex sarawaketensis Kük.
- Carex × sardloqensis E.Dahl
- Carex sargentiana (Hemsl.) S.R.Zhang
- Carex sartwelliana Olney
- Carex sartwellii Dewey
- Carex satakeana T.Koyama
- Carex satsumensis Franch. & Sav.
- Carex saxatilis L.
- Carex × saxenii Raymond
- Carex saxicola Tang & F.T.Wang
- Carex saxilittoralis A.Robertson
- Carex saximontana Mack.
- Carex scabrata Schwein.
- Carex scabrella Wahlenb.
- Carex scabrida J.R.Starr
- Carex scabrifolia Steud. – scabrous-leaf sedge
- Carex scabripes Cherm.
- Carex scabrirostris Kük.
- Carex scabrisacca Ohwi & Ryu
- Carex scabriuscula Mack.
- Carex scaposa C.B.Clarke
- Carex schaffneri Boeckeler
- Carex × schallertii Murr
- Carex × schatzii Kneuck.
- Carex schiedeana Kunze
- Carex schimperiana Boeckeler
- Carex schliebenii Podlech
- Carex schmidtii Meinsh. – Schmidt's sedge
- Carex schneideri Nelmes
- Carex schottii Dewey
- Carex × schuetzeana Figert
- Carex schweickerdtii (Merxm. & Podlech) Luceño & Martín-Bravo
- Carex schweinitzii Dewey ex Schwein.
- Carex sciocapensis Luceño, Márq.-Corro & Sánchez-Villegas
- Carex scirpoidea Michx.
- Carex scita Maxim.
- Carex scitiformis Kük.
- Carex scitula Boott
- Carex sclerocarpa Franch.
- Carex sclerophylla (Nelmes) K.L.Wilson
- Carex scolopendriformis F.T.Wang & Tang ex P.C.Li
- Carex scoparia Schkuhr ex Willd.
- Carex scopulorum Holm
- Carex scopulus X.F.Jin & W.Jie Chen
- Carex secalina Willd. ex Wahlenb.
- Carex secta Boott
- Carex sectoides (Kük.) Edgar
- Carex sedakowii C.A.Mey. ex Meinsh. – Sedakov's sedge
- Carex sellowiana Schltdl.
- Carex semihyalofructa Tak.Shimizu
- Carex sempervirens Vill.
- Carex senanensis Ohwi
- Carex × senayana Soó
- Carex sendaica Franch.
- Carex × sendtneriana Brügger
- Carex senta Boott
- Carex seorsa Howe
- Carex seposita C.B.Clarke
- Carex sequeirae Míguez, Jim.Mejías, Ben.Benítez & Martín-Bravo
- Carex serpenticola Zika
- Carex serratodens S.Watson
- Carex × serravalensis Beauverd
- Carex serreana Hand.-Mazz.
- Carex seticulmis Boeckeler
- Carex setifolia Kunze
- Carex setigera D.Don
- Carex setigluma Reznicek & S.González
- Carex setosa Boott
- Carex setschwanensis (Hand.-Mazz.) S.R.Zhang
- Carex shaanxiensis F.T.Wang & Tang ex P.C.Li
- Carex × shakushizawaensis Akiyama
- Carex shandanica Y.C.Yang
- Carex shanensis C.B.Clarke
- Carex shangchengensis S.Yun Liang
- Carex shanghangensis S.Yun Liang
- Carex sheldonii Mack.
- Carex shimidzensis Franch. – long-tail-spike sedge
- Carex × shinanoana Nakai ex Aliyama
- Carex shinnersii P.Rothr. & Reznicek
- Carex shiriyajirensis Akiyama ex Tatew.
- Carex shortiana Dewey & Torr.
- Carex shuangbaiensis L.K.Dai
- Carex shuchengensis S.W.Su & Q.Zhang
- Carex siamensis (Ohwi) S.R.Zhang
- Carex siccata Dewey
- Carex sichouensis P.C.Li
- Carex siderosticta Hance – creeping broad-leaf sedge
- Carex siguanabae Jim.Mejías, Acedo, Reznicek & Lois
- Carex sikokiana Franch. & Sav.
- Carex silicea Olney
- Carex silvestrii Pamp.
- Carex silvestris (Hamlin) K.A.Ford
- Carex simensis Hochst. ex A.Rich.
- Carex simpliciuscula Wahlenb.
- Carex simulans C.B.Clarke
- Carex simulata Mack.
- Carex sinclairii Boott ex Cheeseman
- Carex sinoaristata Tang & F.T.Wang ex L.K.Dai
- Carex sinodissitiflora Tang & F.T.Wang ex L.K.Dai
- Carex sinosupina Y.F.Lu & X.F.Jin
- Carex siroumensis Koidz. – potae sedge
- Carex skottsbergiana Kük.
- Carex socialis Mohlenbr. & Schwegman
- Carex sociata Boott
- Carex socotrana Repka & P.Madera
- Carex sodiroi Kük.
- Carex × soerensenii Lepage
- Carex sohayakiensis K.T.Takah. & M.N.Tamura
- Carex solandri Boott
- Carex songorica Kar. & Kir.
- Carex × sooi Jakucs
- Carex sordida Van Heurck & Müll.Arg. – short forest-live sedge
- Carex sorianoi Barros
- Carex sororia Kunth
- Carex spachiana Boott
- Carex sparganioides Muhl. ex Willd.
- Carex sparsinux C.B.Clarke ex Franch.
- Carex spartea Wahlenb.
- Carex specifica L.H.Bailey
- Carex speciosa Kunth
- Carex spectabilis Dewey
- Carex specuicola J.T.Howell
- Carex sphaerogyna Baker
- Carex spicata Huds.
- Carex spicatopaniculata Boeckeler ex C.B.Clarke
- Carex spicigera Nees
- Carex × spiculosa Fr.
- Carex spilocarpa Steud.
- Carex spinirostris Colenso
- Carex spissa L.H.Bailey ex Hemsl.
- Carex splendentissima U.Kang & J.Chung
- Carex sprengelii Dewey ex Spreng.
- Carex squamiformis (Y.C.Yang) S.R.Zhang
- Carex × squamigera V.I.Krecz. & Luchnik
- Carex squarrosa L.
- Carex standleyana Steyerm.
- Carex stenantha Franch. & Sav.
- Carex stenocarpa Turcz. ex V.I.Krecz.
- Carex stenophylla Wahlenb.
- Carex stenoptila F.J.Herm.
- Carex stenostachys Franch. & Sav.
- Carex sterilis Willd.
- Carex steudneri Boeckeler
- Carex stevenii (Holm) Kalela
- Carex steyermarkii Standl.
- Carex stipata Muhl. ex Willd. – awl-fruit sedge
- Carex stiphrogyne Gilli
- Carex stipitinux C.B.Clarke ex Franch.
- Carex stipitiutriculata P.C.Li
- Carex stokesii F.Br.
- Carex stracheyi Boott ex C.B.Clarke
- Carex stramentitia Boott ex Boeckeler
- Carex straminea Willd. ex Schkuhr
- Carex straminiformis L.H.Bailey
- Carex streptorrhampha Nelmes
- Carex striata Michx.
- Carex striatula Michx.
- Carex stricta Lam.
- Carex × stricticulmis Holmb.
- Carex × strictiformis Almq.
- Carex strictissima (Kük.) K.A.Ford
- Carex strigosa Huds.
- Carex × strigosula Chatenier
- Carex stuessyi G.A.Wheeler
- Carex × stygia Fr.
- Carex styloflexa Buckley
- Carex stylosa C.A.Mey.
- Carex subandrogyna G.A.Wheeler & Guagl.
- Carex subantarctica Speg.
- Carex subbracteata Mack.
- Carex subcapitata X.F.Jin, C.Z.Zheng & B.Y.Ding
- Carex subcernua Ohwi
- Carex × subcostata Holmb.
- Carex subdivulsa (Kük.) G.A.Wheeler
- Carex subdola Boott
- Carex suberecta (Olney) Britton
- Carex subfilicinoides Kük.
- Carex subfuegiana G.A.Wheeler
- Carex subfusca W.Boott
- Carex subglabra (X.F.Jin & C.Z.Zheng) X.F.Jin & Y.F.Lu
- Carex × subimpressa Clokey
- Carex subinclinata T.Koyama
- Carex subinflata Nelmes
- Carex submollicula Tang & F.T.Wang ex L.K.Dai
- Carex subnigricans Stacey
- Carex × subpaleacea J.Cay.
- Carex × subpatula Holmb.
- Carex subperakensis L.K.Ling & Y.Z.Huang
- Carex subphysodes Popov ex V.I.Krecz.
- Carex subpumila Tang & F.T.Wang ex L.K.Dai
- Carex × subrecta J.Cay.
- Carex × subreducta Lepage
- Carex subremota Charit.
- Carex subsacculata (G.A.Wheeler & Goetgh.) J.R.Starr
- Carex subscabrella Kük.
- Carex subspathacea Wormsk. ex Hornem. – Hoppner's sedge
- Carex subtilis K.A.Ford
- Carex subtransversa C.B.Clarke
- Carex subtrigona (Nelmes) K.L.Wilson
- Carex subtumida (Kük.) Ohwi
- Carex subumbellata Meinsh. – subumbellate sedge
- Carex subviridis K.A.Ford
- Carex × subviridula Fernald
- Carex suifunensis Kom. – narrow-scale sedge
- Carex × sullivantii Boott
- Carex × sumikawaensis Fujiw. & Y.Matsuda
- Carex superata Naczi, Reznicek & B.A.Ford
- Carex supina Willd. ex Wahlenb.
- Carex sutchuensis Franch.
- Carex × suziella Podp.
- Carex swanii (Fernald) Mack.
- Carex sychnocephala J.Carey
- Carex sylvatica Huds.
- Carex × sylvenii Holmb.

=== T ===
- Carex tabatae Katsuy.
- Carex tachirensis Steyerm.
- Carex tahitensis F.Br.
- Carex tahoensis Smiley
- Carex taihuensis S.W.Su & S.M.Xu
- Carex × takhtadjanii Jac.Koopman & Wieclaw
- Carex × takoensis Y.Endo & Yashiro
- Carex talbotii Kottaim.
- Carex taldycola Meinsh.
- Carex tamakii T.Koyama
- Carex tamana Steyerm.
- Carex tangiana Ohwi
- Carex tangii Kük.
- Carex tangulashanensis Y.C.Yang
- Carex tapintzensis Franch.
- Carex taprobanensis T.Koyama
- Carex tashiroana Ohwi
- Carex tasmanica Kük.
- Carex tatjanae Malyschev
- Carex tatsiensis (Franch.) Kük.
- Carex tavoyensis Nelmes
- Carex tegulata H.Lév. & Vaniot – orbicular sedge
- Carex tehuacana Reznicek & S.González
- Carex teinogyna Boott – slender-pedicel sedge
- Carex temnolepis Franch.
- Carex tenax Chapm. ex Dewey
- Carex × tenebricans Holmb.
- Carex tenebrosa Boott
- Carex tenejapensis Reznicek & S.González
- Carex × tenelliformis Holmb.
- Carex tenera Dewey
- Carex tenuiculmis (Petrie) Heenan & de Lange
- Carex tenuiflora Wahlenb. – sparse-flower sedge
- Carex tenuiformis H.Lév. & Vaniot – shadow sedge
- Carex tenuinervis Ohwi
- Carex tenuior T.Koyama & T.I.Chuang
- Carex tenuipaniculata P.C.Li
- Carex tenuispicula Tang ex S.Y.Liang
- Carex teres Boott
- Carex tereticaulis F.Muell.
- Carex × terschellingensis Jac.Koopman, Wieclaw & Waltje
- Carex testacea Sol. ex Boott
- Carex tetanica Schkuhr
- Carex tetrastachya Scheele
- Carex tetsuoi Ohwi
- Carex texensis (Torr. ex L.H.Bailey) L.H.Bailey
- Carex thailandica T.Koyama
- Carex thanikaimoniana Govind.
- Carex × thermalis K.Nagas. & S.Sakag.
- Carex thibetica Franch.
- Carex thinii B.A.Ford & J.R.Starr
- Carex thomsonii Boott
- Carex thornei Naczi
- Carex thouarsii Carmich.
- Carex thunbergii Steud.
- Carex thurberi Dewey ex Torr.
- Carex tianmushanica C.Z.Zheng & X.F.Jin
- Carex tianschanica T.V.Egorova
- Carex tibetikobresia S.R.Zhang
- Carex timida Naczi & B.A.Ford
- Carex × timmiana Junge
- Carex tincta (Fernald) Fernald
- Carex tingnungii X.F.Jin
- Carex titovii V.I.Krecz.
- Carex × toezensis Simonk.
- Carex tojquianensis Standl. & Steyerm.
- Carex tokarensis T.Koyama
- Carex tokuii J.Oda & Nagam.
- Carex tolucensis (F.J.Herm.) Reznicek
- Carex tomentosa L.
- Carex tompkinsii J.T.Howell
- Carex tonsa (Fernald) E.P.Bicknell
- Carex toreadora Steyerm.
- Carex × torgesiana Kük.
- Carex × tornabenei Chiov.
- Carex toroensis G.A.Wheeler
- Carex torreyi Tuck.
- Carex torta Boott ex Tuck.
- Carex tovarensis Reznicek & G.A.Wheeler
- Carex townsendii Mack.
- Carex toyoshimae Tuyama
- Carex trachycarpa Cheeseman
- Carex traiziscana F.Schmidt
- Carex transandina G.A.Wheeler
- Carex transversa Boott
- Carex trautvetteriana Kom.
- Carex traversii Kirk
- Carex × treverica Hausskn.
- Carex triangula J.R.Starr
- Carex triangularis Boeckeler
- Carex tribuloides Wahlenb.
- Carex tricephala Boeckeler
- Carex × trichina Fernald
- Carex trichocarpa Muhl. ex Willd.
- Carex trichodes Steud.
- Carex tricholepis Nelmes
- Carex trichophylla Nelmes
- Carex tricolor Velen.
- Carex trifida Cav.
- Carex trigonosperma Ohwi
- Carex trinervis Degl.
- Carex triquetra Boott
- Carex trisperma Dewey
- Carex tristachya Thunb. – shiny-spike sedge
- Carex tristis M.Bieb.
- Carex trongii N.K.Khoi
- Carex troodi Turrill
- Carex truncatigluma C.B.Clarke
- Carex truncatirostris S.W.Su & S.M.Xu
- Carex tsaiana F.T.Wang & Tang ex P.C.Li
- Carex tsaratananensis Cherm.
- Carex tschonoskii V.I.Krecz.
- Carex tsiangii F.T.Wang & Tang
- Carex tsoi Merr. & Chun
- Carex tsuishikarensis Koidz. & Ohwi
- Carex tsukudensis (T.Koyama) K.T.Takah. & M.N.Tamura
- Carex tsushimensis (Ohwi) Ohwi
- Carex tuberculata Liebm.
- Carex tubulosa Pamp.
- Carex tuckermanii Boott
- Carex tumida Boott
- Carex tumidula Ohwi
- Carex tuminensis Kom. – Dumangang sedge
- Carex tumulicola Mack.
- Carex tungfangensis L.K.Dai & S.M.Huang
- Carex tunicata (Hand.-Mazz.) S.R.Zhang
- Carex tunimanensis Standl. & Steyerm.
- Carex turbaria J.R.Starr
- Carex turbinata Liebm.
- Carex × turfosa Fr.
- Carex turgescens Torr.
- Carex turkestanica Regel
- Carex turrita C.B.Clarke
- Carex × turuli Simonk.
- Carex turumiquirensis Steyerm.
- Carex tweedieana Nees
- Carex typhina Michx.

=== U ===
- Carex uber Ohwi
- Carex uda Maxim. – Uda needle sedge
- Carex × uechtritziana K.Richt.
- Carex uhligii K.Schum. ex C.B.Clarke
- Carex ulobasis V.I.Krecz. – montane sedge
- Carex ultra L.H.Bailey
- Carex uluguruensis Luceño & M.Escudero
- Carex umbellata Willd.
- Carex umbricola K.L.Wilson
- Carex umbrosa Host
- Carex umbrosiformis H.Lév.
- Carex uncifolia Cheeseman
- Carex uncinata L.f.
- Carex unciniiformis Boeckeler
- Carex uncinioides Boott
- Carex × ungavensis Lepage
- Carex ungurensis Litv.
- Carex unilateralis Mack.
- Carex unisexualis C.B.Clarke
- Carex urelytra Ohwi
- Carex ursina Dewey
- Carex uruguensis Boeckeler
- Carex ussuriensis Kom. – Ussuri sedge
- Carex utahensis Reznicek & D.F.Murray
- Carex utriculata Boott
- Carex × uzenensis Koidz.

=== V ===
- Carex vacillans Drejer
- Carex vaginata Tausch – sheathed sedge
- Carex vaginosa (C.B.Clarke) S.R.Zhang
- Carex valbrayi H.Lév.
- Carex vallata Charit.
- Carex vallicola Dewey
- Carex vallis-pulchrae Phil.
- Carex vallis-rosetto K.Schum.
- Carex vanheurckii Müll.Arg. – northern meadow sedge
- Carex vaniotii H.Lév.
- Carex ventosa C.B.Clarke
- Carex venusta Dewey
- Carex vernacula L.H.Bailey
- Carex verrucosa Muhl.
- Carex verticillata Zoll. & Moritzi
- Carex vesca C.B.Clarke ex Kük.
- Carex vesicaria L. – blister sedge
- Carex vesicata Meinsh.
- Carex vesiculosa Boott
- Carex vestita Willd.
- Carex vexans F.J.Herm.
- Carex via-aquae Jim.Mejías, Lois, Acedo & Reznicek
- Carex via-incaica Jim.Mejías & Roalson
- Carex × viadrina Figert
- Carex vibhae (Jana, R.C.Srivast. & Bhaumik) O.Yano
- Carex vicinalis Boott
- Carex vidua Boott ex C.B.Clarke
- Carex vietnamica Raymond
- Carex × villacensis Kük.
- Carex × vimariensis Hausskn. ex Berthold
- Carex virescens Muhl. ex Willd.
- Carex virgata Sol. ex Boott
- Carex viridimarginata Kük.
- Carex viridistellata Derieg, Reznicek & Bruederle
- Carex vixdentata (Kük.) G.A.Wheeler
- Carex vizarronensis Gómez-Sánchez, Cabrera-Luna, S.González & Reznicek
- Carex × vratislaviensis Figert
- Carex vulcani Hochst. ex Seub.
- Carex vulpina L.
- Carex vulpinaris Nees
- Carex vulpinoidea Michx.

=== W ===
- Carex wahlenbergiana Boott
- Carex wahuensis C.A.Mey.
- Carex wakatipu Petrie
- Carex × walasii Ceyn.-Gield
- Carex walkeri Arn. ex Boott
- Carex wallichiana Spreng.
- Carex waponahkikensis Lovit & A.Haines
- Carex wawuensis W.M.Chu ex S.Yun Liang
- Carex wenshanensis L.K.Dai
- Carex werdermannii L.Gross
- Carex wheeleri J.R.Starr
- Carex whitneyi Olney
- Carex wiegandii Mack.
- Carex wightiana Nees
- Carex willdenowii Willd.
- Carex williamsii Britton
- Carex × winkelmannii Asch. & Graebn.
- Carex winterbottomii C.B.Clarke
- Carex × wolteri Gross
- Carex woodii Dewey
- Carex wootonii Mack.
- Carex wui W.M.Chu ex L.K.Dai
- Carex wutuensis K.T.Fu

=== X ===
- Carex × xanthocarpa Degl.
- Carex xerantica L.H.Bailey
- Carex xerophila Janeway & Zika
- Carex xiphium Kom. – sword-like sedge
- Carex xueyingiana H.J.Yang & Han Xu

=== Y ===
- Carex yadongensis (Y.C.Yang) S.R.Zhang
- Carex yajiangensis Tang & F.T.Wang ex S.Yun Liang
- Carex yakushimensis (Katsuy. & J.Oda) J.Oda & M.N.Tamura
- Carex yamatsutana Ohwi
- Carex yandangshanica C.Z.Zheng & X.F.Jin
- Carex yangii (S.R.Zhang) S.R.Zhang
- Carex yangshuoensis Tang & F.T.Wang ex S.Y.Liang
- Carex yasuii Katsuy.
- Carex yinshanica Y.Z.Zhao
- Carex yonganensis L.K.Dai & Y.Z.Huang
- Carex ypsilandrifolia F.T.Wang & Tang
- Carex yuexiensis S.W.Su & S.M.Xu
- Carex yulungshanensis P.C.Li
- Carex yunlingensis P.C.Li
- Carex yunnanensis Franch.
- Carex yunyiana X.F.Jin & C.Z.Zheng
- Carex yushuensis Y.C.Yang

=== Z ===
- Carex × zahnii Kneuck.
- Carex zekogensis Y.C.Yang
- Carex zhejiangensis X.F.Jin, Y.J.Zhao, C.Z.Zheng & H.W.Zhang
- Carex zhenkangensis Tang & F.T.Wang ex S.Yun Liang
- Carex zhonghaiensis S.Yun Liang
- Carex zikae Roalson & Waterway
- Carex zizaniifolia Raymond
- Carex zotovii (Hamlin) K.A.Ford
- Carex zunyiensis Tang & F.T.Wang
