= Carex oligostachya =

Scientific classification
- Kingdom: Plantae
- Clade: Tracheophytes
- Clade: Angiosperms
- Clade: Monocots
- Clade: Commelinids
- Order: Poales
- Family: Cyperaceae
- Genus: Carex
- Species: C. oligostachya

Binomial name
- Carex oligostachya Nees

Species of sedge

Carex oligostachya is a tussock-forming species of perennial sedge in the family Cyperaceae. It is native to parts of Asia and Malesia from Assam in the west to the Solomon Islands in the east.

It was described by the botanist Christian Gottfried Daniel Nees von Esenbeck in 1854 as published in Hooker's journal of botany and Kew Garden miscellany.

== See also ==
- List of Carex species
