= Carex obscura =

Scientific classification
- Kingdom: Plantae
- Clade: Tracheophytes
- Clade: Angiosperms
- Clade: Monocots
- Clade: Commelinids
- Order: Poales
- Family: Cyperaceae
- Genus: Carex
- Species: C. obscura

Binomial name
- Carex obscura Nees

Species of sedge

Carex obscura is a tussock-forming species of perennial sedge in the family Cyperaceae. It is native to parts of Asia from Pakistan in the west to China in the east.

It was described by the botanist Christian Gottfried Daniel Nees von Esenbeck in 1834 as published in Contributions to the Botany of India.

== See also ==
- List of Carex species
