= Carex kaoi =

Scientific classification
- Kingdom: Plantae
- Clade: Embryophytes
- Clade: Tracheophytes
- Clade: Spermatophytes
- Clade: Angiosperms
- Clade: Monocots
- Clade: Commelinids
- Order: Poales
- Family: Cyperaceae
- Genus: Carex
- Species: C. kaoi

Binomial name
- Carex kaoi Tang & F.T.Wang ex S.Y.Liang

Species of sedge

Carex kaoi is a tussock-forming perennial in the family Cyperaceae. It is endemic to south eastern parts of China.

== See also ==
- List of Carex species
