= Carex yangii =

Scientific classification
- Kingdom: Plantae
- Clade: Embryophytes
- Clade: Tracheophytes
- Clade: Angiosperms
- Clade: Monocots
- Clade: Commelinids
- Order: Poales
- Family: Cyperaceae
- Genus: Carex
- Species: C. yangii

Binomial name
- Carex yangii (S.R.Zhang) S.R.Zhang

Synonyms
- Kobresia gracilis Y.C.Yang; Kobresia yangii S.R.Zhang

Species of sedge

Carex yangii is a tussock-forming perennial in the family Cyperaceae. It is endemic to south central parts of China in the Sichuan province.

== See also ==
- List of Carex species
