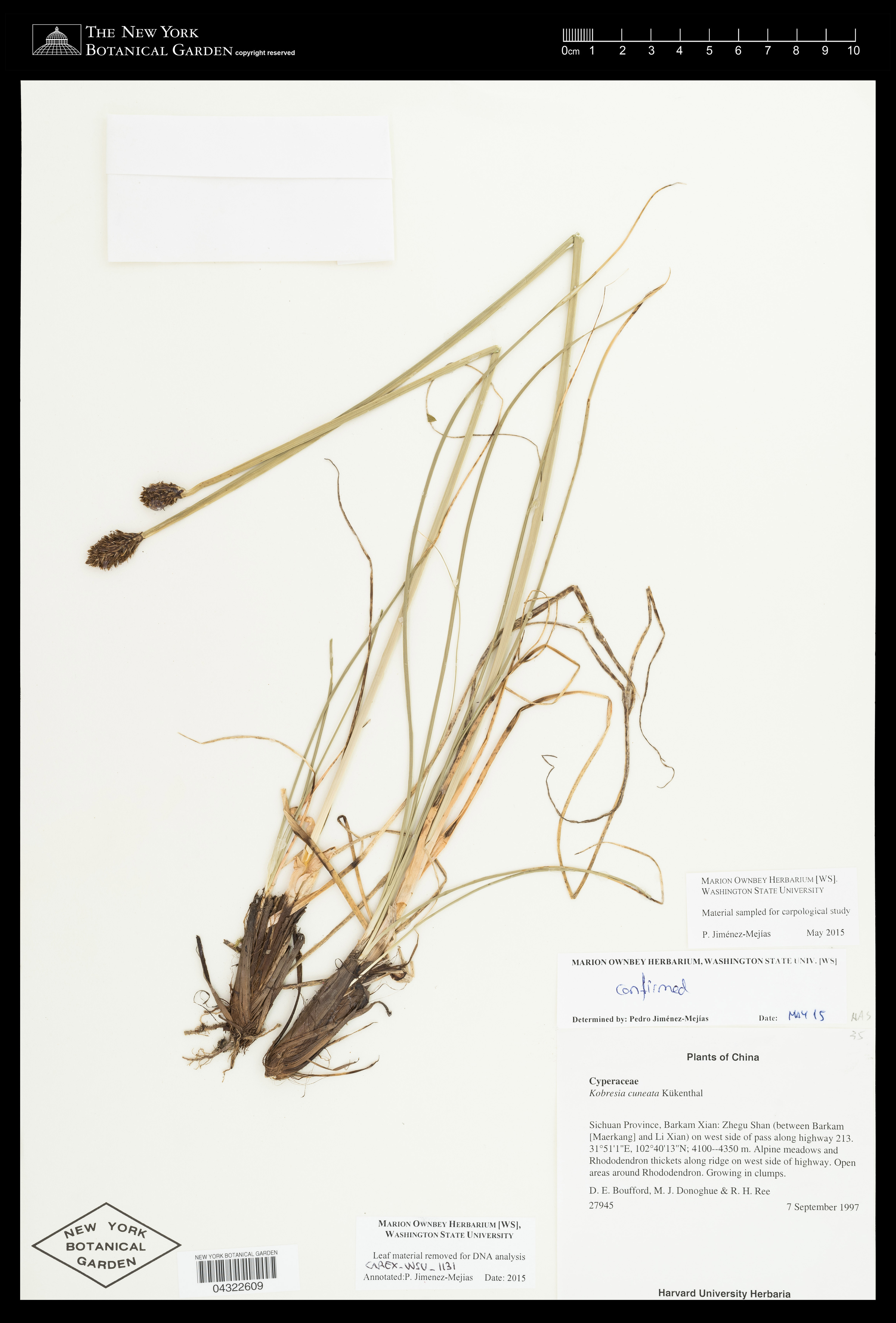

Scientific classification
- Kingdom: Plantae
- Clade: Tracheophytes
- Clade: Angiosperms
- Clade: Monocots
- Clade: Commelinids
- Order: Poales
- Family: Cyperaceae
- Genus: Carex
- Species: C. lepidochlamys

Binomial name
- Carex lepidochlamys (F.T.Wang & Tang ex P.C.Li) S.R.Zhang

Synonyms
- Kobresia lepidochlamys F.T.Wang & Tang ex P.C.Li; Kobresia cuneata Kük.

= Carex lepidochlamys =

Species of sedge

Carex lepidochlamys is a tussock-forming perennial in the family Cyperaceae. It is endemic to central parts of China as far north as Qinghai and to Tibet in the west.

== See also ==
- List of Carex species
