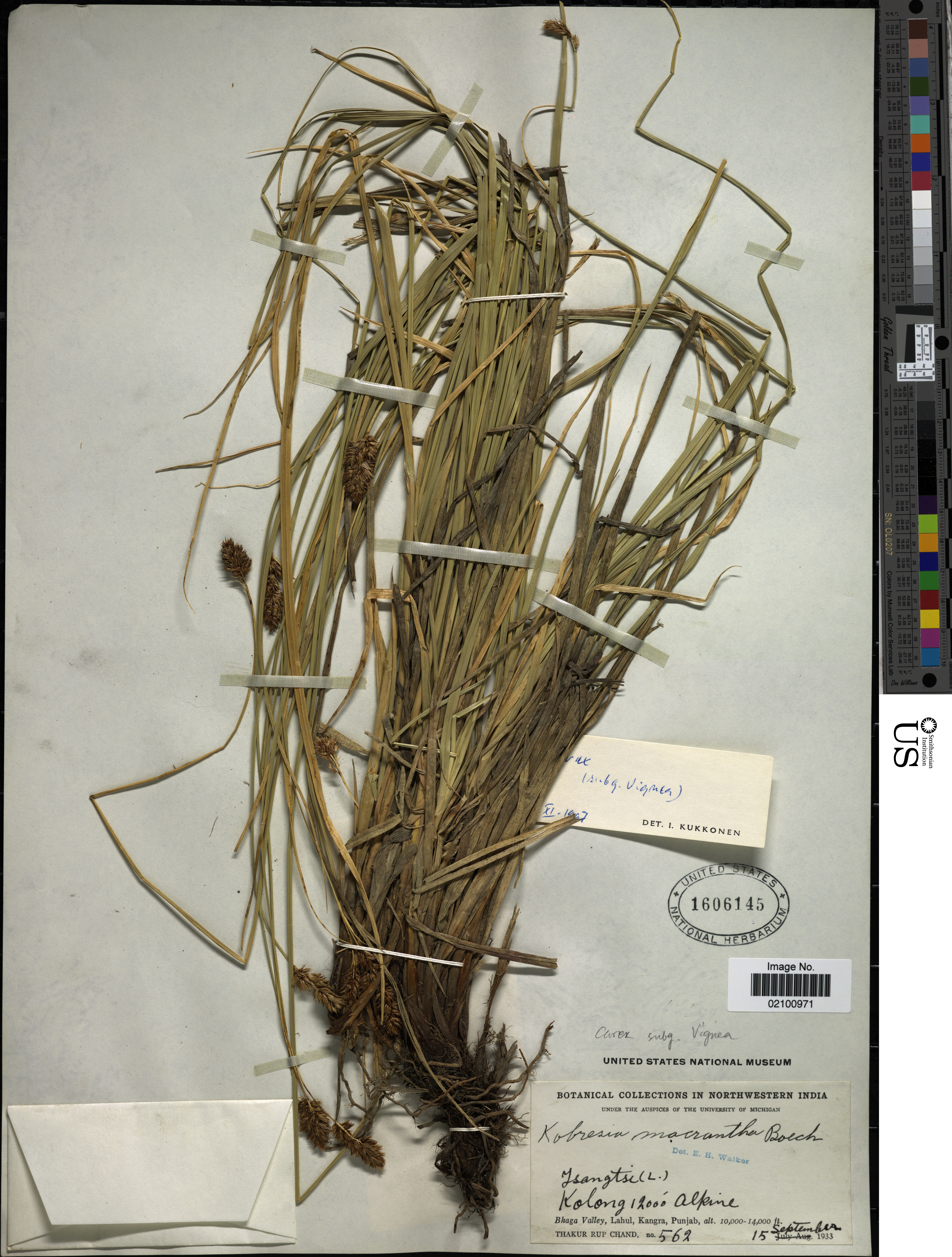

Scientific classification
- Kingdom: Plantae
- Clade: Embryophytes
- Clade: Tracheophytes
- Clade: Spermatophytes
- Clade: Angiosperms
- Clade: Monocots
- Clade: Commelinids
- Order: Poales
- Family: Cyperaceae
- Genus: Carex
- Species: C. nudicarpa

Binomial name
- Carex nudicarpa (Y.C.Yang) S.R.Zhang

= Carex nudicarpa =

Species of sedge

Carex nudicarpa is a tussock-forming perennial in the family Cyperaceae. It is endemic to central and western parts of China and parts of the Himalaya.

== See also ==
- List of Carex species
