= Carex globistylosa =

Scientific classification
- Kingdom: Plantae
- Clade: Tracheophytes
- Clade: Angiosperms
- Clade: Monocots
- Clade: Commelinids
- Order: Poales
- Family: Cyperaceae
- Genus: Carex
- Species: C. globistylosa

Binomial name
- Carex globistylosa P.C.Li

Species of sedge

Carex globistylosa is a tussock-forming perennial in the family Cyperaceae. It is endemic to the Sichuan province in south-central China.

== See also ==
- List of Carex species
