= Carex zekogensis =

Scientific classification
- Kingdom: Plantae
- Clade: Embryophytes
- Clade: Tracheophytes
- Clade: Spermatophytes
- Clade: Angiosperms
- Clade: Monocots
- Clade: Commelinids
- Order: Poales
- Family: Cyperaceae
- Genus: Carex
- Species: C. zekogensis

Binomial name
- Carex zekogensis Y.C.Yang

Species of sedge

Carex zekogensis is a tussock-forming perennial in the family Cyperaceae. It is endemic to northern parts of China in the province of Qinghai.

== See also ==
- List of Carex species
