= Carex pseuduncinoides =

Scientific classification
- Kingdom: Plantae
- Clade: Tracheophytes
- Clade: Angiosperms
- Clade: Monocots
- Clade: Commelinids
- Order: Poales
- Family: Cyperaceae
- Genus: Carex
- Species: C. pseuduncinoides

Binomial name
- Carex pseuduncinoides (Noltie) O.Yano & S.R.Zhang

Synonyms
- Kobresia kansuensis Kük.; Kobresia pseuduncinoides Noltie

Species of sedge

Carex pseuduncinoides is a tussock-forming perennial in the family Cyperaceae. It is endemic to parts of Tibet, Nepal and central China.

== See also ==
- List of Carex species
