= Carex hopeiensis =

Scientific classification
- Kingdom: Plantae
- Clade: Tracheophytes
- Clade: Angiosperms
- Clade: Monocots
- Clade: Commelinids
- Order: Poales
- Family: Cyperaceae
- Genus: Carex
- Species: C. hopeiensis

Binomial name
- Carex hopeiensis F.T.Wang & Tang

Species of sedge

Carex hopeiensis is a tussock-forming perennial in the family Cyperaceae. It is endemic to north western parts of China in Hebei province.

== See also ==
- List of Carex species
