= Carex hirtelloides =

Scientific classification
- Kingdom: Plantae
- Clade: Embryophytes
- Clade: Tracheophytes
- Clade: Spermatophytes
- Clade: Angiosperms
- Clade: Monocots
- Clade: Commelinids
- Order: Poales
- Family: Cyperaceae
- Genus: Carex
- Species: C. hirtelloides

Binomial name
- Carex hirtelloides (Kük.) F.T.Wang & Tang ex P.C.Li

Species of sedge

Carex hirtelloides is a tussock-forming perennial in the family Cyperaceae. It is endemic to south central parts of China in the provinces of Yunnan and Sichuan.

== See also ==
- List of Carex species
