= Carex angustiutricula =

Scientific classification
- Kingdom: Plantae
- Clade: Embryophytes
- Clade: Tracheophytes
- Clade: Angiosperms
- Clade: Monocots
- Clade: Commelinids
- Order: Poales
- Family: Cyperaceae
- Genus: Carex
- Species: C. angustiutricula

Binomial name
- Carex angustiutricula F.T.Wang & Tang ex L.K.Dai

Species of sedge

Carex angustiutricula is a tussock-forming perennial in the family Cyperaceae. It is endemic to south central parts of China in the Sichuan province.

== Description ==
This sedge has a short woody rhizome and has no runners. It has a tufted habit with thin brown and smooth culms that are typically 30 to 35 cm (12 to 14 in) in length and have a triangular cross section and are sheathed toward the base of the plant. The flat and scaborous leaves are usually about the same length as the culms and have a width of 3 to 6 mm (0.12 to 0.24 in). It flowers between April and May in its natural range and produces and inflorescence with three to four spikes.

== Distribution ==
It is often situated in wet areas on mountainsides with elevations of about 1,600 m (5,200 ft) in the Sichuan province of China.

== See also ==
- List of Carex species
