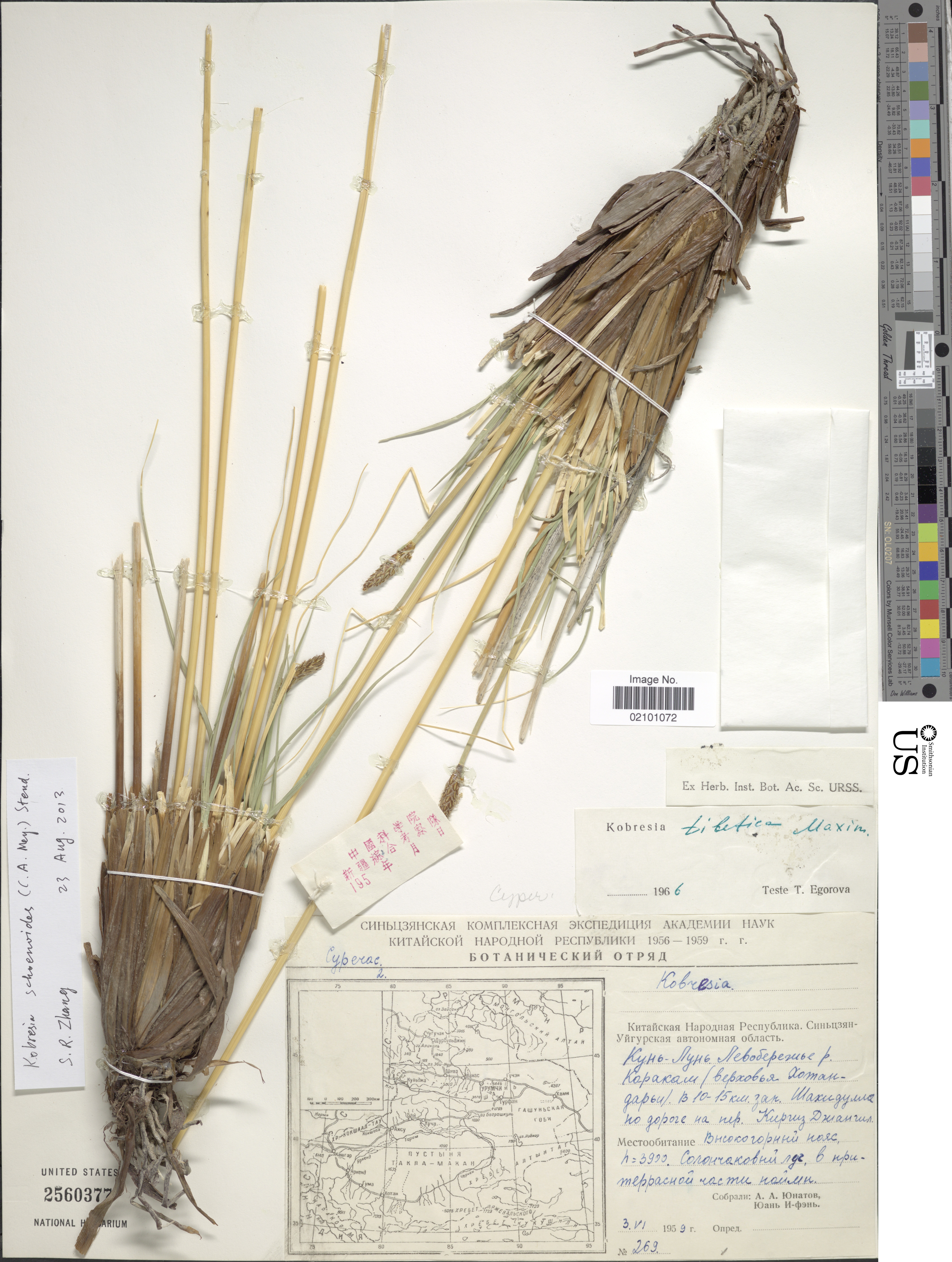

Scientific classification
- Kingdom: Plantae
- Clade: Embryophytes
- Clade: Tracheophytes
- Clade: Angiosperms
- Clade: Monocots
- Clade: Commelinids
- Order: Poales
- Family: Cyperaceae
- Genus: Carex
- Species: C. tibetikobresia

Binomial name
- Carex tibetikobresia S.R.Zhang

= Carex tibetikobresia =

Species of sedge

Carex tibetikobresia is a tussock-forming perennial in the family Cyperaceae. It is endemic to Tibet and western and central parts of China.

== See also ==
- List of Carex species
