= Carex bijiangensis =

Scientific classification
- Kingdom: Plantae
- Clade: Embryophytes
- Clade: Tracheophytes
- Clade: Angiosperms
- Clade: Monocots
- Clade: Commelinids
- Order: Poales
- Family: Cyperaceae
- Genus: Carex
- Species: C. bijiangensis

Binomial name
- Carex bijiangensis S.Yun Liang & S.R.Zhang

Species of sedge

Carex bijiangensis is a tussock-forming perennial in the family Cyperaceae. It is endemic to Tibet and south central parts of China in the Yunnan province.

== See also ==
- List of Carex species
