= Carex ligulata =

Scientific classification
- Kingdom: Plantae
- Clade: Tracheophytes
- Clade: Angiosperms
- Clade: Monocots
- Clade: Commelinids
- Order: Poales
- Family: Cyperaceae
- Genus: Carex
- Section: Carex sect. Occlusae
- Species: C. ligulata

Binomial name
- Carex ligulata Nees

Synonyms
- Carex austrokoreensis Ohwi; Carex bakanensis H.Lév. & Vaniot; Carex dunniana H.Lév.; Carex hebecarpa subsp. ligulata (Nees) T.Koyama; Carex hebecarpa var. ligulata (Nees) Kük.; Carex keiskei Miq.; Carex ligulata var. glabriutriculata Q.S.Wang

Species of grass-like plant

Carex ligulata is a species of flowering plant in the sedge family, Cyperaceae. Carex ligulata is native to Asia from India to Japan. It grows in a variety of habitats, including grasslands, forests, mountain slopes, and riparian areas.
