= Carex serpenticola =

Scientific classification
- Kingdom: Plantae
- Clade: Tracheophytes
- Clade: Angiosperms
- Clade: Monocots
- Clade: Commelinids
- Order: Poales
- Family: Cyperaceae
- Genus: Carex
- Species: C. serpenticola

Binomial name
- Carex serpenticola Zika

Species of grass-like plant

Carex serpenticola is a species of sedge in the family Cyperaceae, native to the US states of Oregon and California. It is found on serpentine soils.
