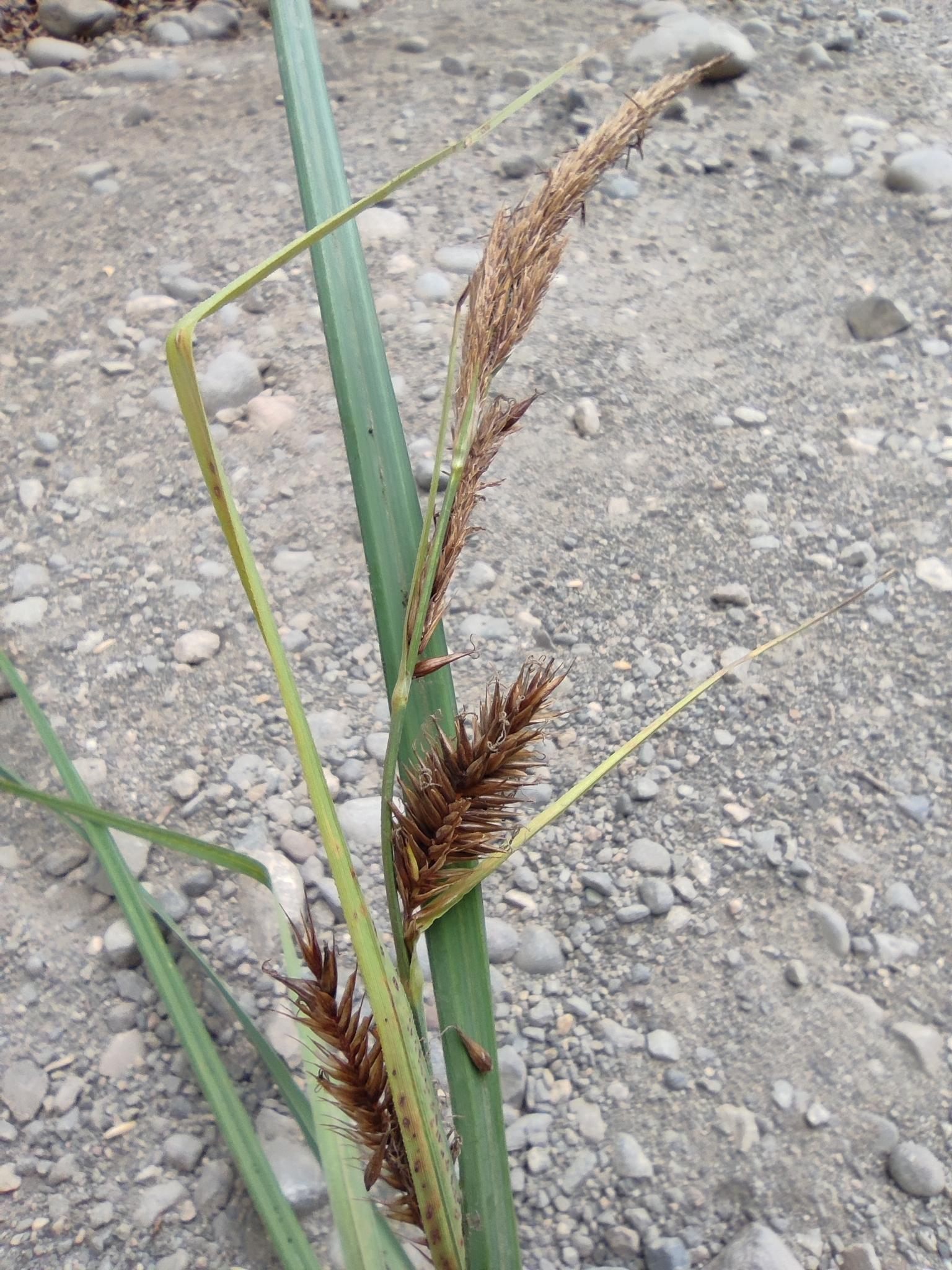

Scientific classification
- Kingdom: Plantae
- Clade: Tracheophytes
- Clade: Angiosperms
- Clade: Monocots
- Clade: Commelinids
- Order: Poales
- Family: Cyperaceae
- Genus: Carex
- Species: C. chilensis

Binomial name
- Carex chilensis Brong.

= Carex chilensis =

Species of plant

Carex chilensis is a species of flowering plant in the family Cyperaceae. It is native to Chile, Argentina and Uruguay. In Chile, it is distributed between the Biobio and the Aysen regions.
