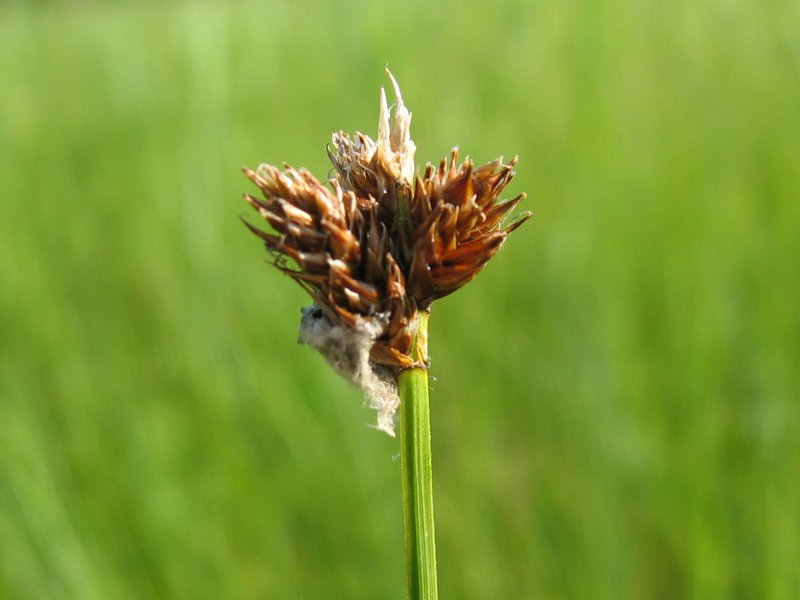
- Carex leporina (= "C. ovalis")

Scientific classification
- Kingdom: Plantae
- Clade: Tracheophytes
- Clade: Angiosperms
- Clade: Monocots
- Clade: Commelinids
- Order: Poales
- Family: Cyperaceae
- Genus: Carex
- Subgenus: Carex subg. Vignea
- Section: Carex sect. Ovales; Kunth

= Carex sect. Ovales =

Group of sedges

Carex sect. Ovales is a section of the genus Carex, containing around 85 species of sedge. It is the most diverse section of the genus in North America, containing 72 species:

- Carex abrupta
- Carex adusta
- Carex alata
- Carex albolutescens
- Carex amplectens
- Carex arapahoensis
- Carex argyrantha
- Carex athrostachya
- Carex bebbii
- Carex bicknellii
- Carex brevior
- Carex constanceana
- Carex crawfordii
- Carex cristatella
- Carex cumulata
- Carex davyi
- Carex ebenea
- Carex egglestonii
- Carex festucacea
- Carex feta
- Carex foenea
- Carex fracta
- Carex gracilior
- Carex harfordii
- Carex haydeniana
- Carex hormathodes
- Carex hyalina
- Carex illota
- Carex integra
- Carex leporina
- Carex leporinella
- Carex longii
- Carex macloviana
- Carex mariposana
- Carex merritt-fernaldii
- Carex microptera
- Carex missouriensis
- Carex molesta
- Carex molestiformis
- Carex multicostata
- Carex muskingumensis
- Carex normalis
- Carex opaca
- Carex oronensis
- Carex ovalis, (nom. illeg. synonym for C. leporina L. and C. scoparia Schkuhr ex Willd.)
- Carex ozarkana
- Carex pachystachya
- Carex petasata
- Carex phaeocephala
- Carex praticola
- Carex preslii
- Carex projecta
- Carex proposita
- Carex reniformis
- Carex scoparia
- Carex shinnersii
- Carex silicea
- Carex specifica
- Carex stenoptila
- Carex straminea
- Carex straminiformis
- Carex subbracteata
- Carex suberecta
- Carex subfusca
- Carex tahoensis
- Carex tenera
- Carex tetrastachya
- Carex tincta
- Carex tribuloides
- Carex unilateralis
- Carex vexans
- Carex wootonii
- Carex xerantica
