= Riverbank sedge =

Riverbank sedge may refer to:

- Carex emoryi
- Carex stenoptila, native to North America
