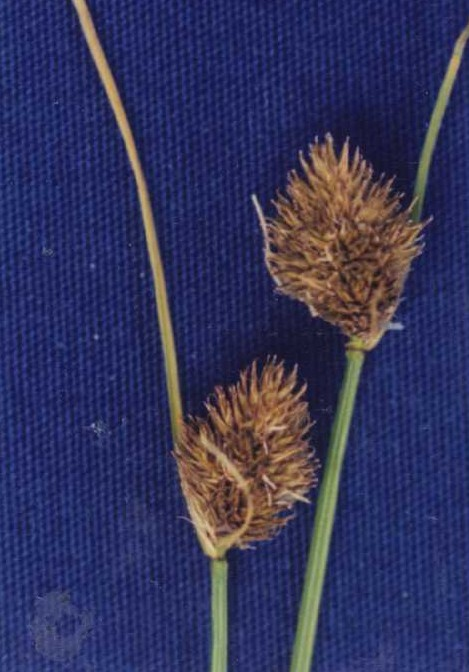

Conservation status
- Secure (NatureServe)

Scientific classification
- Kingdom: Plantae
- Clade: Tracheophytes
- Clade: Angiosperms
- Clade: Monocots
- Clade: Commelinids
- Order: Poales
- Family: Cyperaceae
- Genus: Carex
- Subgenus: Carex subg. Vignea
- Section: Carex sect. Ovales
- Species: C. athrostachya

Binomial name
- Carex athrostachya Olney

= Carex athrostachya =

Species of grass-like plant

Carex athrostachya is a species of sedge known by the common name slenderbeak sedge. It is native to western North America, including Alaska to central Canada, the western contiguous United States, and just into Baja California.

== Description ==
Carex athrostachya grows in wet and seasonally wet areas, such as wetlands and meadows. It produces dense clumps of stems up to 80 centimeters tall. The inflorescence is a dense green to brown cluster one or two centimeters long.
