= Carex suberecta =

Scientific classification
- Kingdom: Plantae
- Clade: Tracheophytes
- Clade: Angiosperms
- Clade: Monocots
- Clade: Commelinids
- Order: Poales
- Family: Cyperaceae
- Genus: Carex
- Subgenus: Carex subg. Vignea
- Section: Carex sect. Ovales
- Species: C. suberecta

Binomial name
- Carex suberecta (Olney) Britton

Species of grass-like plant

Carex suberecta, known as prairie straw sedge, is a species of sedge native to North America.
