= Hayden's sedge =

Hayden's sedge is a common name for several plants and may refer to:

- Carex haydenii, native to Canada and the United States
- Carex haydeniana
