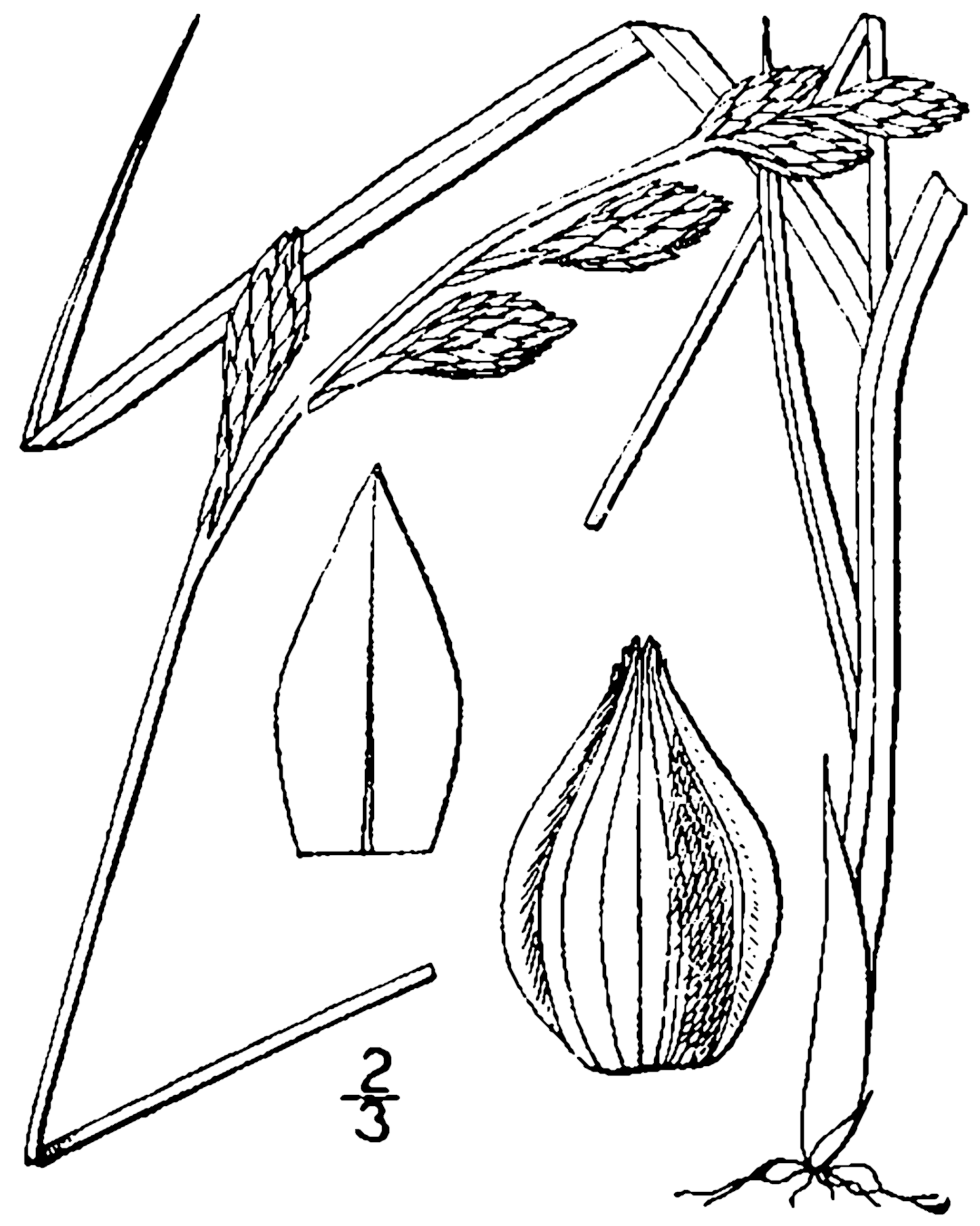

Scientific classification
- Kingdom: Plantae
- Clade: Tracheophytes
- Clade: Angiosperms
- Clade: Monocots
- Clade: Commelinids
- Order: Poales
- Family: Cyperaceae
- Genus: Carex
- Subgenus: Carex subg. Vignea
- Section: Carex sect. Ovales
- Species: C. silicea

Binomial name
- Carex silicea Olney

= Carex silicea =

Species of grass-like plant

Carex silicea, known as beach sedge, is a species of sedge native to North America. It is found in the northeastern United States and southeastern Canada.
