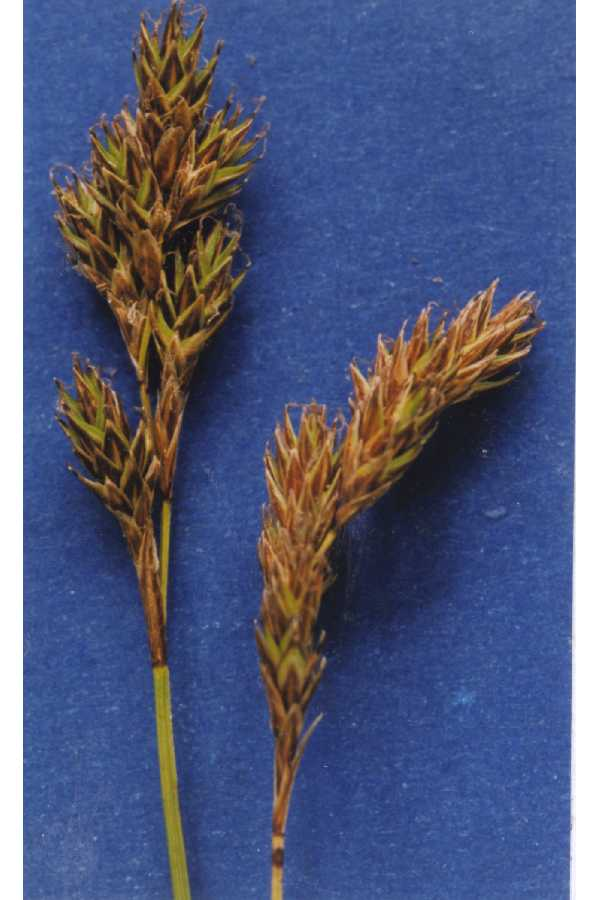

Scientific classification
- Kingdom: Plantae
- Clade: Tracheophytes
- Clade: Angiosperms
- Clade: Monocots
- Clade: Commelinids
- Order: Poales
- Family: Cyperaceae
- Genus: Carex
- Subgenus: Carex subg. Vignea
- Section: Carex sect. Ovales
- Species: C. praticola

Binomial name
- Carex praticola Rydb.

Synonyms
- Carex piperi

= Carex praticola =

Species of grass-like plant

Carex praticola is a species of sedge known by the common name meadow sedge. It is native to most of northern North America, including most of Canada and the northernmost United States. It grows in many habitat types from wet to dry, including moist mountain meadows and woodlands. This sedge produces dense clumps of stems approaching a meter in maximum height. The inflorescence is an erect or nodding cluster of several flower spikes in color light greenish or brown to white. The fruit is covered in a perigynium which is white to cream, sometimes with a coppery center, and translucent.
