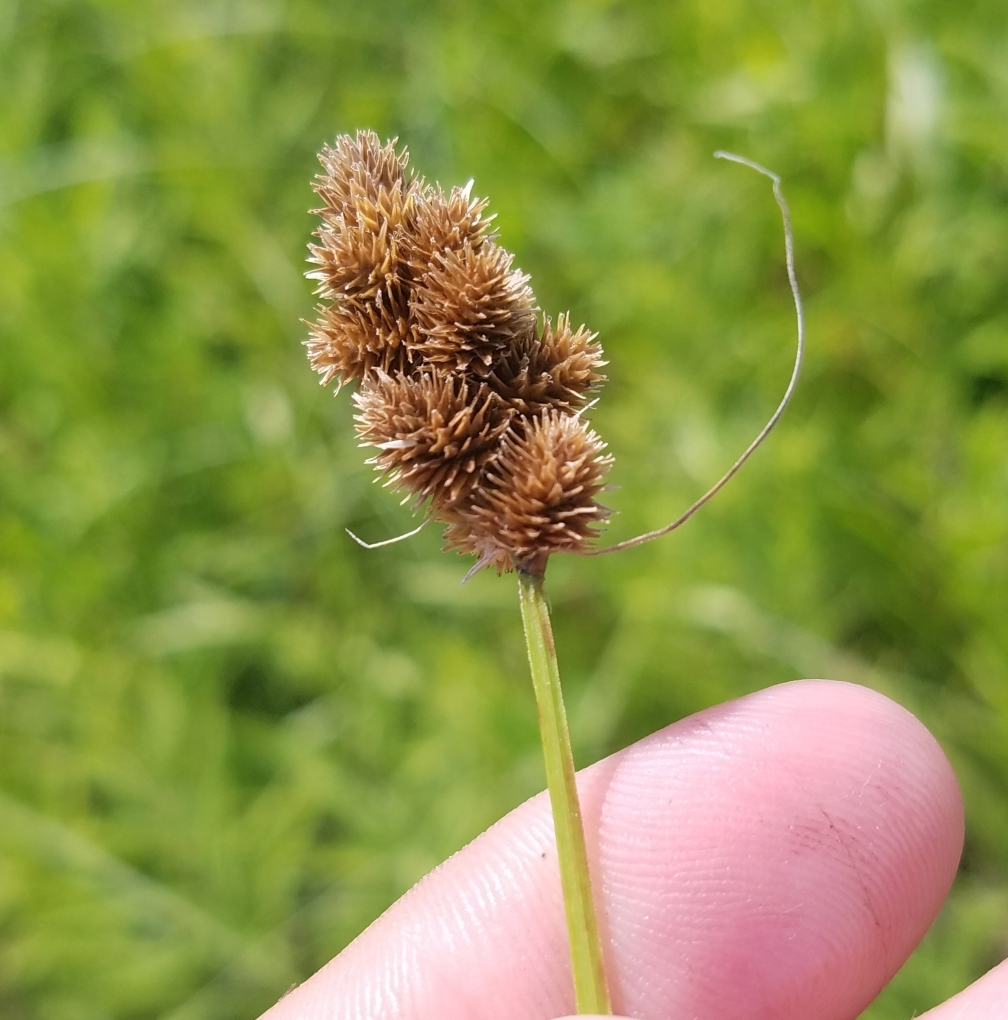

Scientific classification
- Kingdom: Plantae
- Clade: Tracheophytes
- Clade: Angiosperms
- Clade: Monocots
- Clade: Commelinids
- Order: Poales
- Family: Cyperaceae
- Genus: Carex
- Section: Carex sect. Ovales
- Species: C. cristatella

Binomial name
- Carex cristatella Britton

= Carex cristatella =

Species of grass-like plant

Carex cristatella is a species of sedge native to eastern North America. It is an introduced species in Europe. Carex cristatella is a common species in wetlands such as swamps, marshes, shorelines, and wet prairies.
