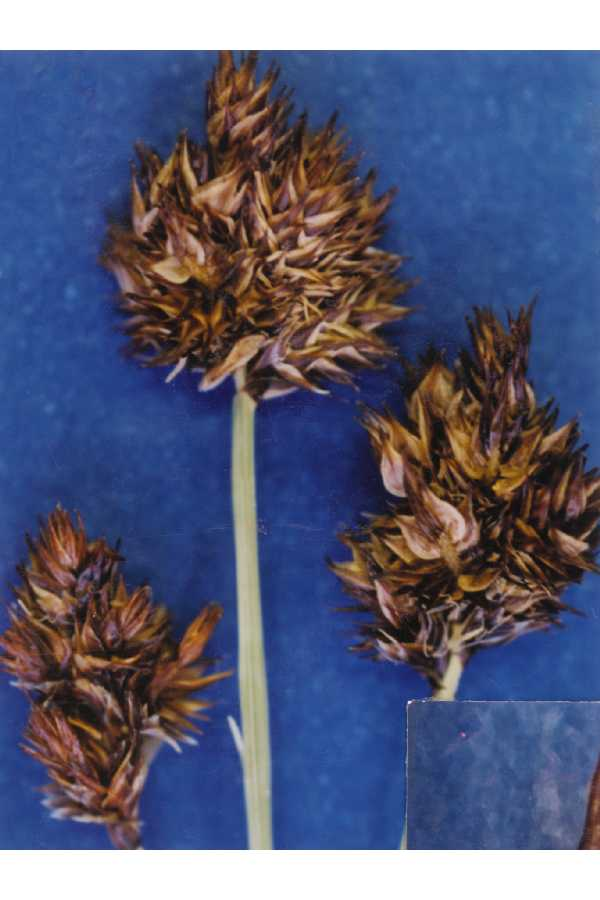

Scientific classification
- Kingdom: Plantae
- Clade: Tracheophytes
- Clade: Angiosperms
- Clade: Monocots
- Clade: Commelinids
- Order: Poales
- Family: Cyperaceae
- Genus: Carex
- Subgenus: Carex subg. Vignea
- Section: Carex sect. Ovales
- Species: C. abrupta

Binomial name
- Carex abrupta Mack.

= Carex abrupta =

Species of plant in the sedge family

Carex abrupta is a species of sedge known by the common name abrupt-beaked sedge or abruptbeak sedge. It is native to the western United States from California to Idaho, where it grows in moist mountain habitat such as meadows and slopes.

== Description ==
This perennial sedge forms a dense, erect clump, the stems of which may reach up to 70 centimeters in height. Leaves are basal, with whitish sheaths, and with 3 to 6 blades per fertile culm. The inflorescence is a rounded cluster of spikes 1 to 2 centimeters wide. Each fruit is surrounded by a sac called a perigynium. This is boat-shaped to scoop-shaped with a very narrow, cylindrical beak, which is coppery red to dark brown in color.
