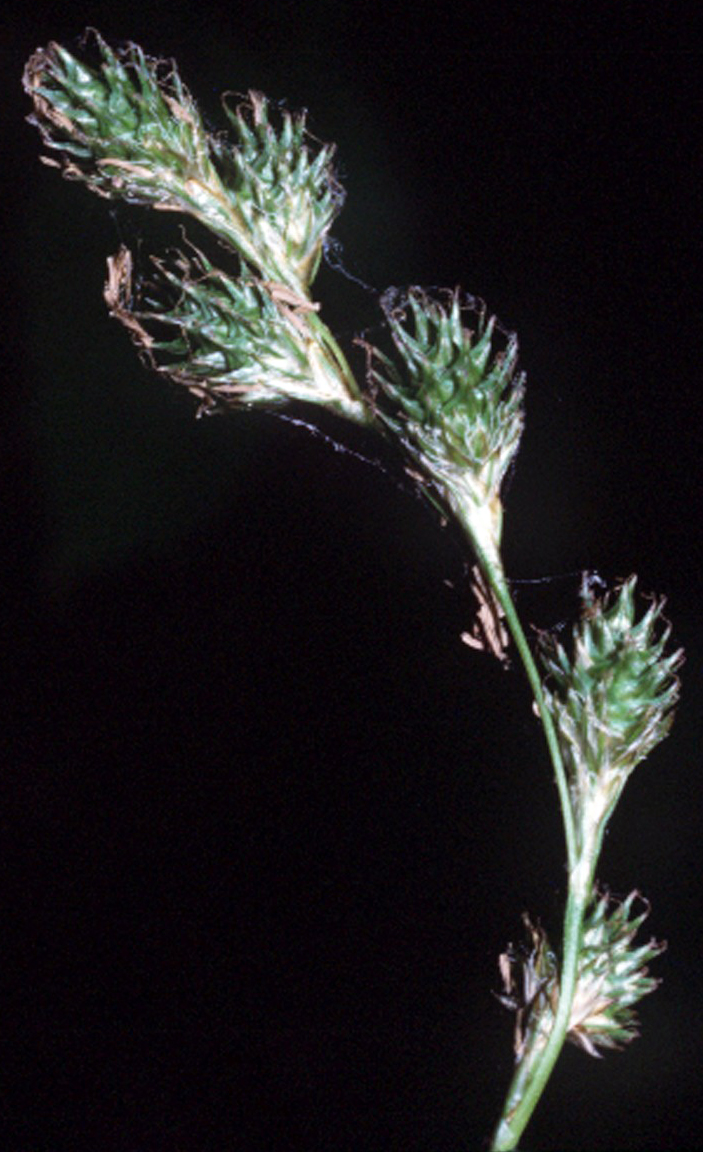

Scientific classification
- Kingdom: Plantae
- Clade: Tracheophytes
- Clade: Angiosperms
- Clade: Monocots
- Clade: Commelinids
- Order: Poales
- Family: Cyperaceae
- Genus: Carex
- Subgenus: Carex subg. Vignea
- Section: Carex sect. Ovales
- Species: C. tenera

Binomial name
- Carex tenera Dewey

Synonyms
- Carex mirabilis var. tenera (Dewey) Prov.; Carex tenera var. major Olney; Diemisa tenera (Dewey) Raf.

= Carex tenera =

Species of grass-like plant

Carex tenera, known as quill sedge, is a species of sedge native to the northern United States and Canada.

Two varieties are recognized in Flora of North America:

- C. tenera var. tenera
- C. tenera var. echinodes (= Carex echinodes (Fernald) P.Rothr., Reznicek & Hipp)
