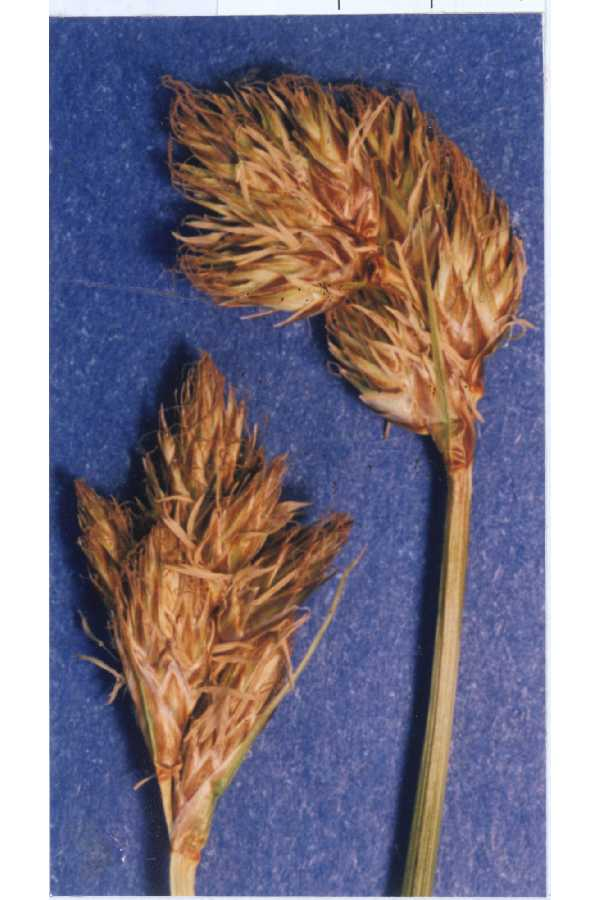

Conservation status
- Imperiled (NatureServe)

Scientific classification
- Kingdom: Plantae
- Clade: Tracheophytes
- Clade: Angiosperms
- Clade: Monocots
- Clade: Commelinids
- Order: Poales
- Family: Cyperaceae
- Genus: Carex
- Subgenus: Carex subg. Vignea
- Section: Carex sect. Ovales
- Species: C. arapahoensis

Binomial name
- Carex arapahoensis Clokey

= Carex arapahoensis =

Species of grass-like plant

Carex arapahoensis, known as Arapaho sedge, is a species of sedge endemic to the western United States. It is found only in Colorado and Utah in alpine and subalpine habitat.
