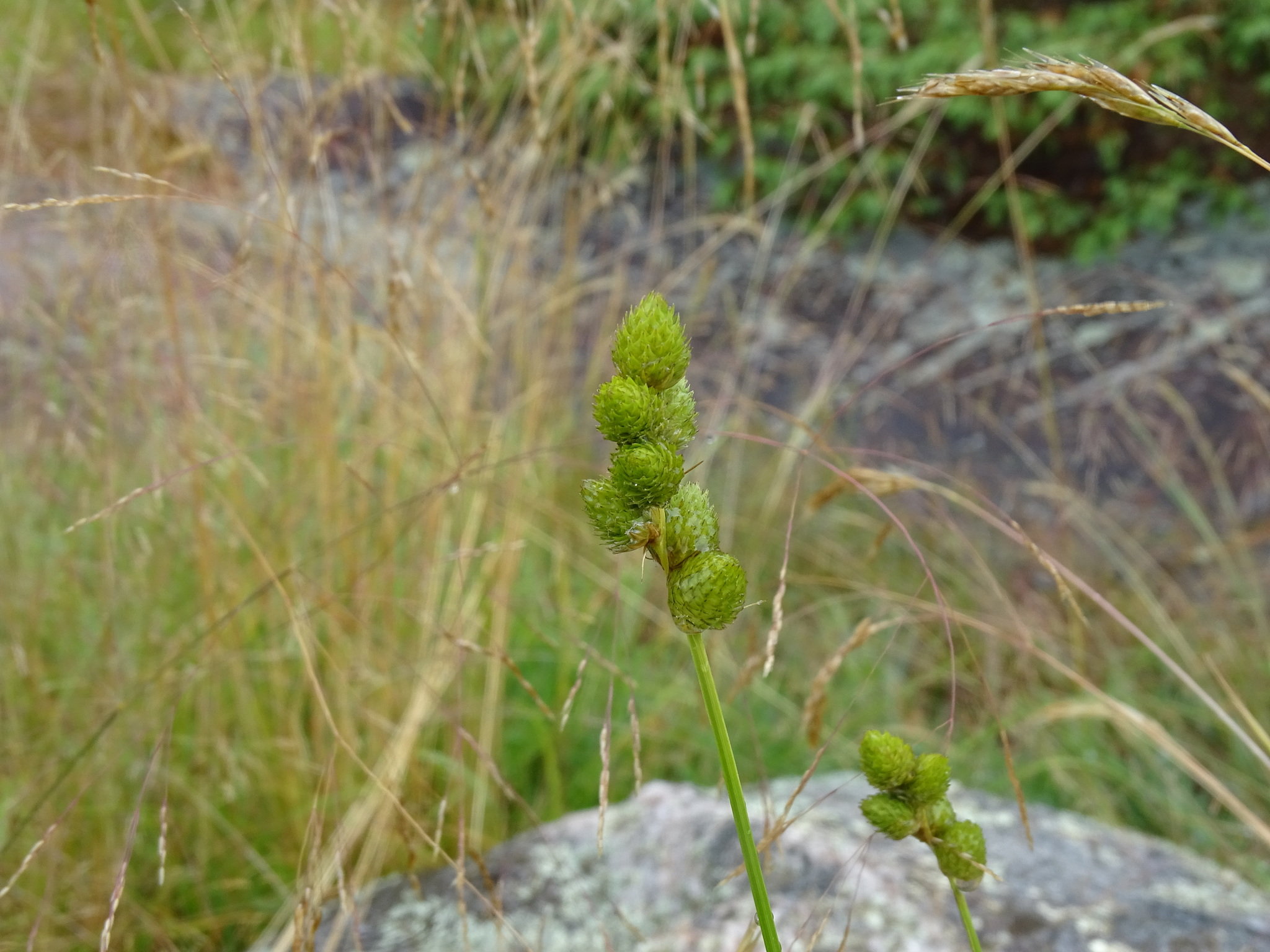

Scientific classification
- Kingdom: Plantae
- Clade: Tracheophytes
- Clade: Angiosperms
- Clade: Monocots
- Clade: Commelinids
- Order: Poales
- Family: Cyperaceae
- Genus: Carex
- Subgenus: Carex subg. Vignea
- Section: Carex sect. Ovales
- Species: C. cumulata

Binomial name
- Carex cumulata (L.H. Bailey) Fernald

= Carex cumulata =

Species of grass-like plant

Carex cumulata, common names clustered sedge, piled sedge, and piled-up sedge is a species of Carex native to North America. It is a perennial.

== Conservation status within the United States ==
It is listed as endangered in Indiana and New Jersey, as threatened in Connecticut. New Hampshire, and New York (state), and as a special concern species in Rhode Island.
