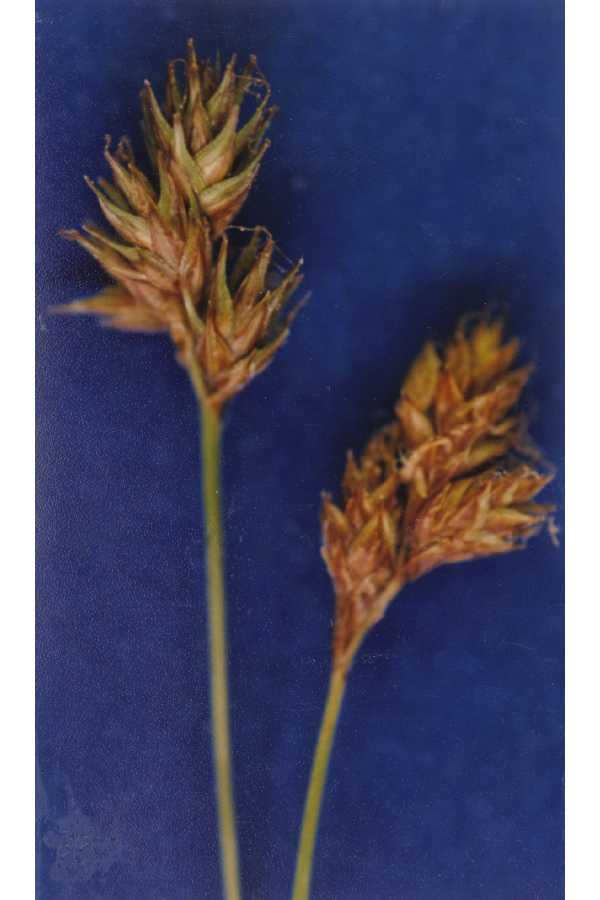

Scientific classification
- Kingdom: Plantae
- Clade: Embryophytes
- Clade: Tracheophytes
- Clade: Spermatophytes
- Clade: Angiosperms
- Clade: Monocots
- Clade: Commelinids
- Order: Poales
- Family: Cyperaceae
- Genus: Carex
- Subgenus: Carex subg. Vignea
- Section: Carex sect. Ovales
- Species: C. straminiformis

Binomial name
- Carex straminiformis L.H.Bailey

= Carex straminiformis =

Species of sedge

Carex straminiformis is a species of sedge known by the common name Shasta sedge.

== Description ==
Carex straminiformis produces dense clumps of stems 20 to 50 centimeters tall with leaves up to about 25 centimeters long. The inflorescence is a dense spherical brown cluster of distinct flower spikes.

== Distribution and habitat ==
This sedge is native to the Western United States where it grows in a number of habitat types in rocky soils. In the southwestern US it grows in California, Nevada, and Utah. In the northwest the species is found in Washington, Oregon, Idaho, and Montana.
