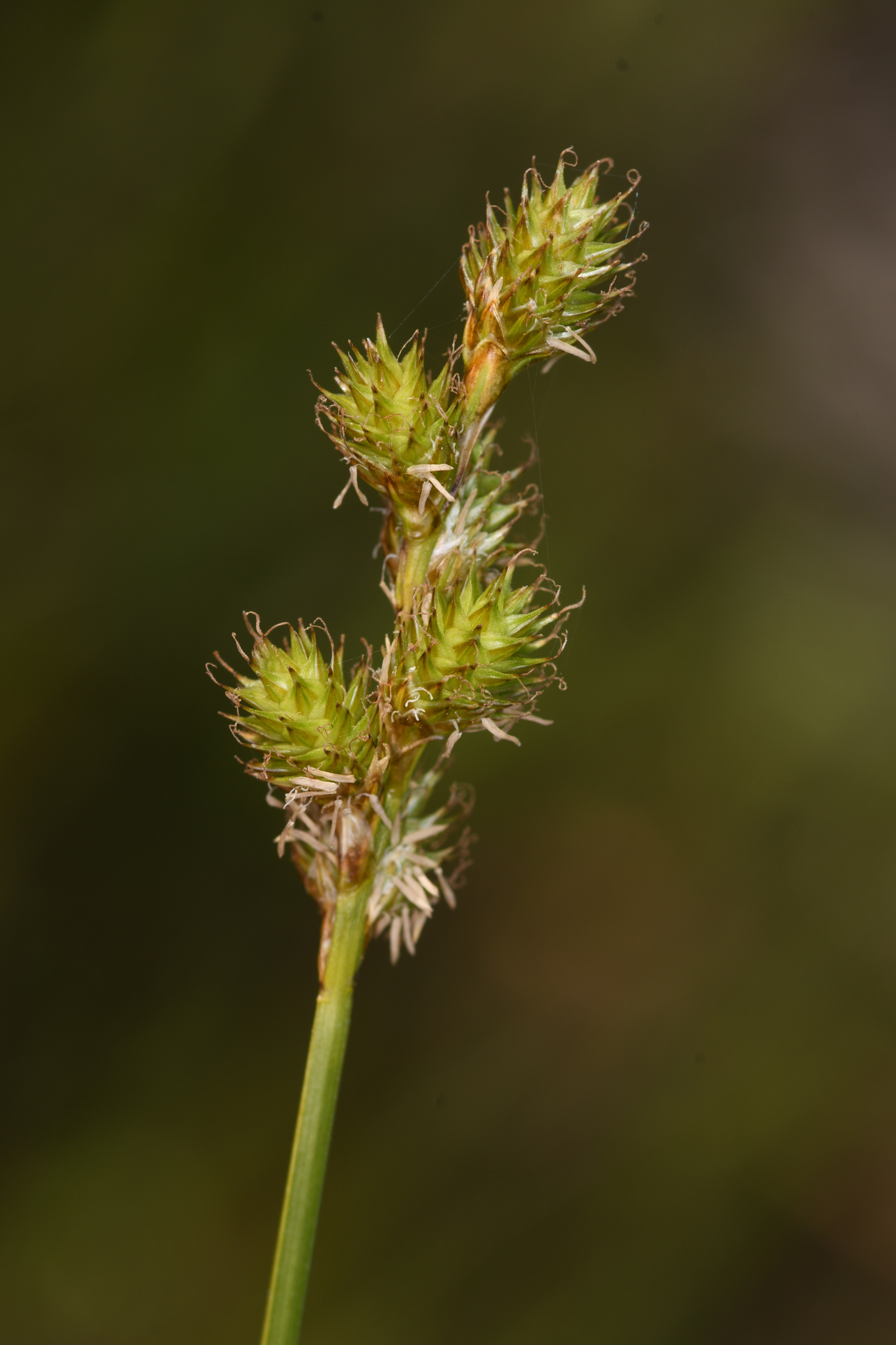
- In the Hetch Hetchy valley

Scientific classification
- Kingdom: Plantae
- Clade: Tracheophytes
- Clade: Angiosperms
- Clade: Monocots
- Clade: Commelinids
- Order: Poales
- Family: Cyperaceae
- Genus: Carex
- Species: C. feta

Binomial name
- Carex feta L.H.Bailey

Synonyms
- Carex feta var. multa L.H.Bailey; Carex straminea var. mixta L.H.Bailey

= Carex feta =

Species of grass-like plant

Carex feta, the green-sheathed sedge or greensheath sedge, is a species of flowering plant in the family Cyperaceae, native to southwestern British Columbia in Canada, and Washington, Oregon, and California in the United States.

== Description ==
The leaf blade is between 2.5 and 5 mm long, with a triangular white patch. The open inflorescence is between 30 and 80 mm long, which are white-green to pale gold in color. The fruit is between 3 and 4.2 mm in diameter, green to pale gold in color, and either ovate or wide-ovate. The fruiting time is between the months of May and August. It is similar to Carex fracta, but the spikelets are smaller and more distinct. It is between 50 and 100 centimeters in height. The inflorescence is elongated but with overlapping ovate spikes. The female scales are 2.7 to 3.5 mm long, and either straw-colored or brown. The perigynia is ovate or broadly ovate with a white tipped beak. Its chromosome number is n = 33.
