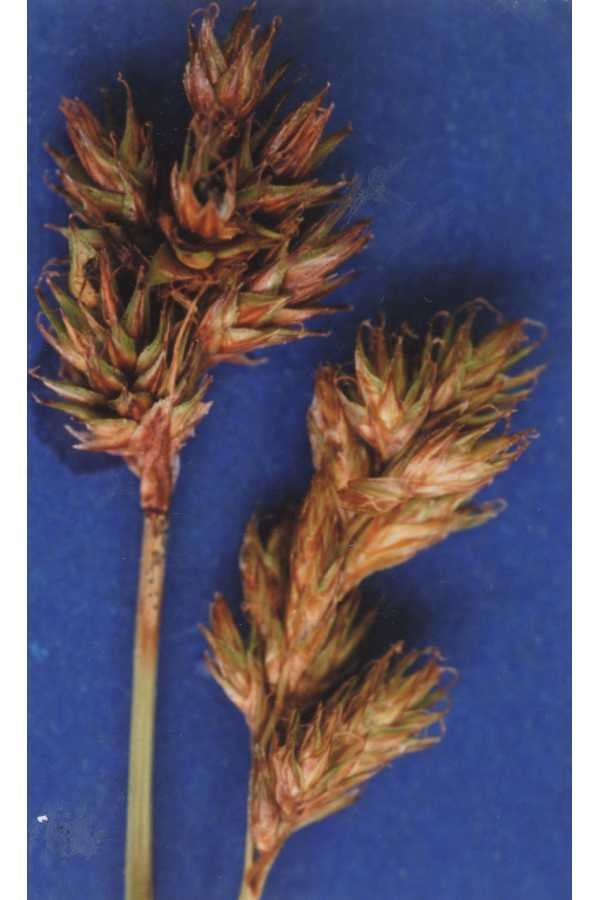

Scientific classification
- Kingdom: Plantae
- Clade: Tracheophytes
- Clade: Angiosperms
- Clade: Monocots
- Clade: Commelinids
- Order: Poales
- Family: Cyperaceae
- Genus: Carex
- Subgenus: Carex subg. Vignea
- Section: Carex sect. Ovales
- Species: C. multicostata

Binomial name
- Carex multicostata Mack.

Synonyms
- Carex pachycarpa

= Carex multicostata =

Species of grass-like plant

Carex multicostata is a species of sedge known by the common name manyrib sedge.

== Distribution ==
This sedge is native to the western United States from California to Montana, where it grows mainly in dry areas in mountain ranges, such as the Sierra Nevada and Transverse Ranges.

== Description ==
Carex multicostata produces a dense clump of stems up to about a meter in maximum height. The inflorescence is roughly triangular in shape and brown or gold in color, a dense cluster of overlapping spikes. The female flower has a covering bract which is reddish with white edges.
