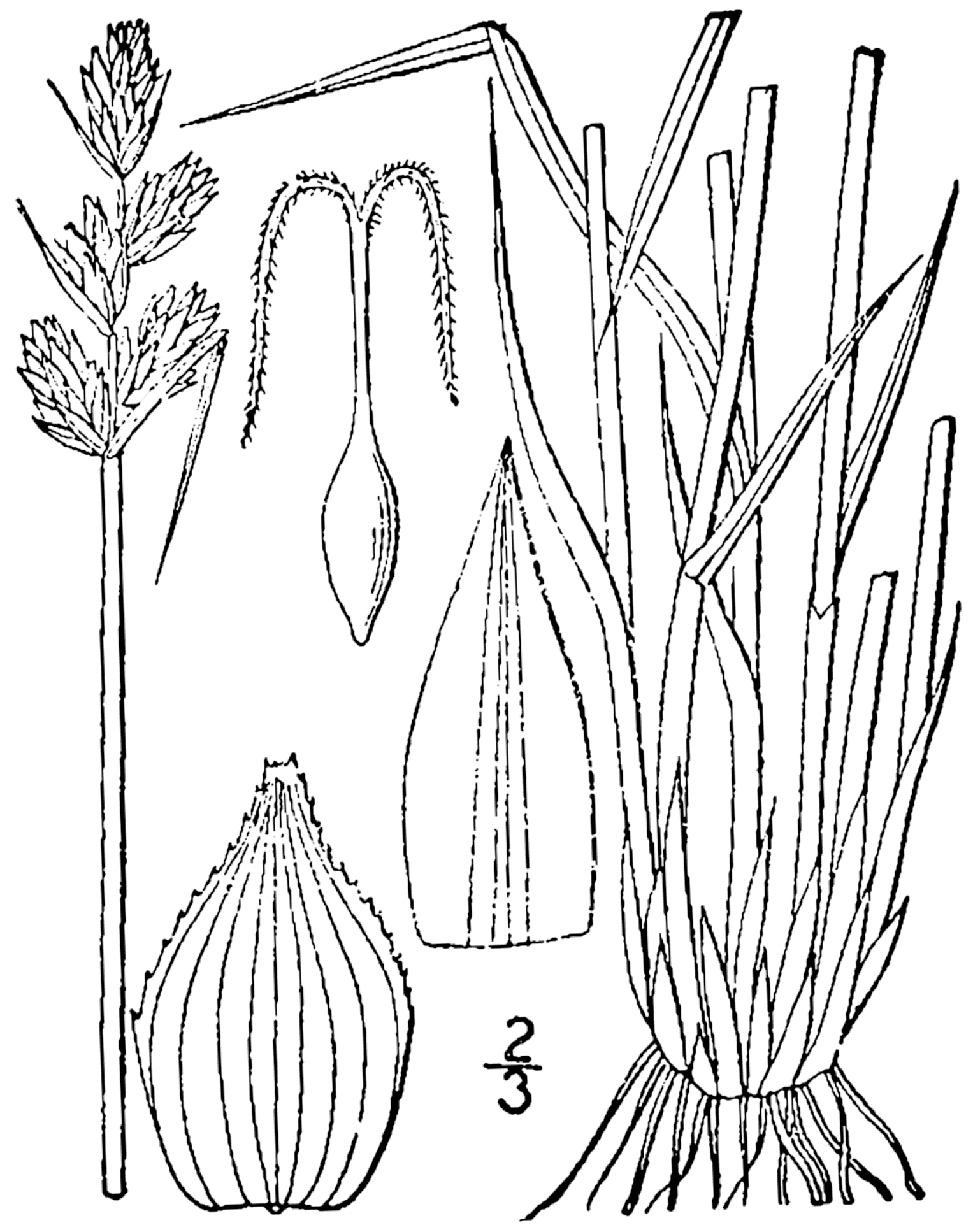

Scientific classification
- Kingdom: Plantae
- Clade: Tracheophytes
- Clade: Angiosperms
- Clade: Monocots
- Clade: Commelinids
- Order: Poales
- Family: Cyperaceae
- Genus: Carex
- Subgenus: Carex subg. Vignea
- Section: Carex sect. Ovales
- Species: C. adusta

Binomial name
- Carex adusta Boott

Synonyms
- List: Carex mirabilis var. adusta (Boott) Prov.; Carex adusta var. glomerata L.H.Bailey; Carex albolutescens var. glomerata Olney ex L.H.Bailey; Carex pinguis L.H.Bailey

= Carex adusta =

Species of plant in the sedge family

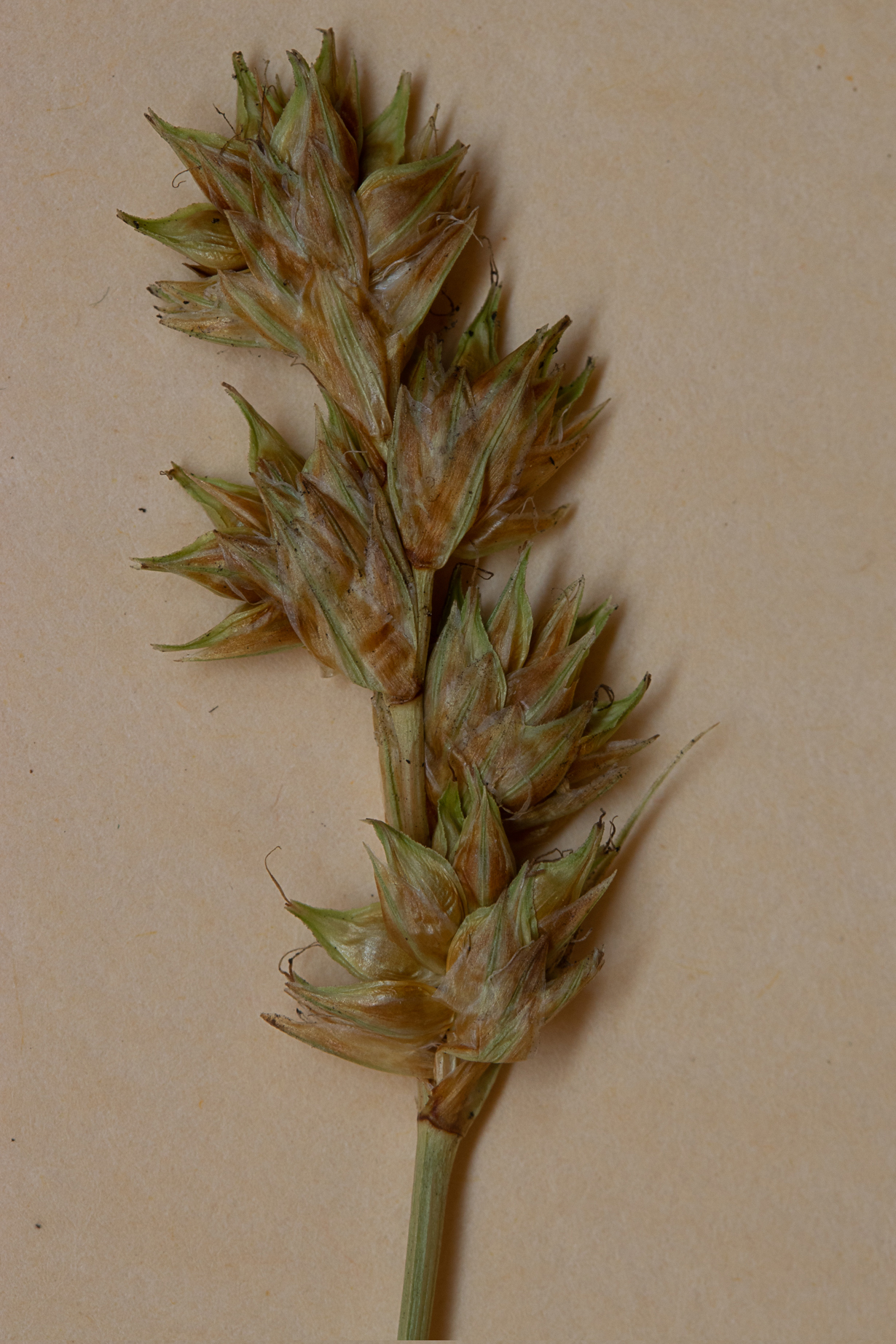
Dried seedhead

Carex adusta, commonly known as the lesser brown sedge, swarthy sedge, browned sedge, or Carex brûlé, is a species of sedge (Carex) in the section Ovales. First described scientifically in 1839 by Francis Boott, Adusta is Latin for "burnt," probably referring to the color.

== Description ==
Carex adusta is a densely tuft-forming, perennial, rhizomatous, grass-like plant growing up to 32 inches in height. Leaves are simple and alternate, and are linear in shape. The plants have densely clustered culms that grow 2.5–8 cm (1.0–3.1 in) high, and leaves measuring 7–25 cm (2.8–9.8 in) long by 2–3.5 mm wide. Inflorescence consists of up to 15 spikes, clustered together. The fruit is an obovate to elliptic achene.

== Distribution and habitat ==
This species is found in Canada and the northeastern United States, where it grows in dry, acidic, sandy soils, woodlands, road beds and disturbed sites.
