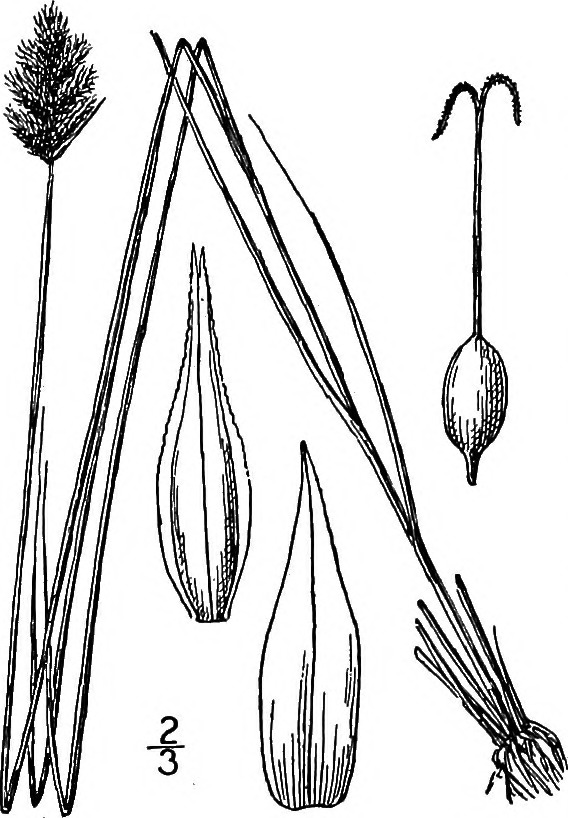

Scientific classification
- Kingdom: Plantae
- Clade: Tracheophytes
- Clade: Angiosperms
- Clade: Monocots
- Clade: Commelinids
- Order: Poales
- Family: Cyperaceae
- Genus: Carex
- Subgenus: Carex subg. Vignea
- Section: Carex sect. Ovales
- Species: C. crawfordii

Binomial name
- Carex crawfordii Fernald

= Carex crawfordii =

Species of grass-like plant

Carex crawfordii, common name Crawford sedge, is a species of Carex native to North America.

== Conservation status within the United States ==
It is listed as endangered in Illinois and Pennsylvania. It is listed as a special concern species and believed extirpated in Connecticut.

== Gallery ==
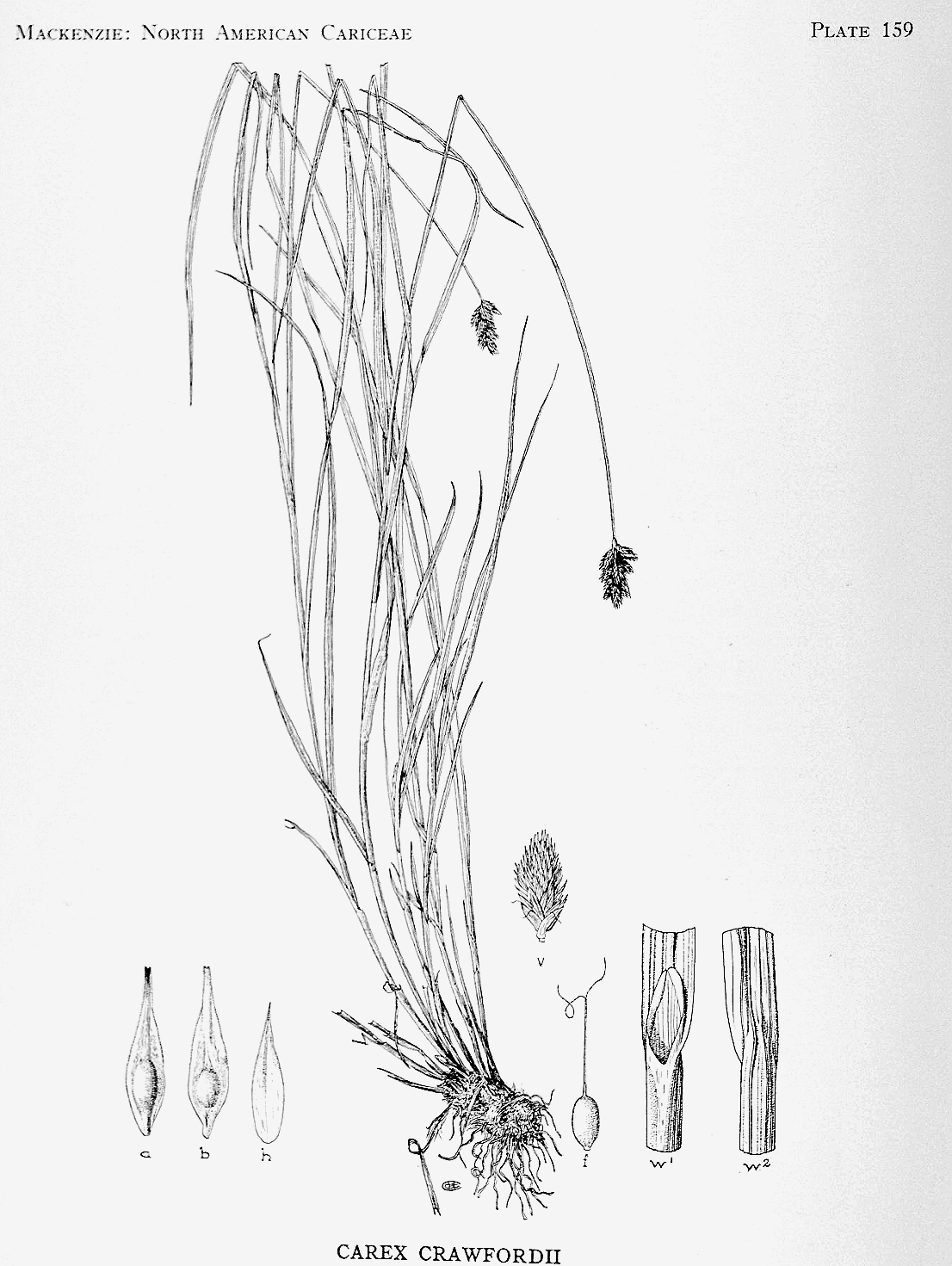
Botanical illustration

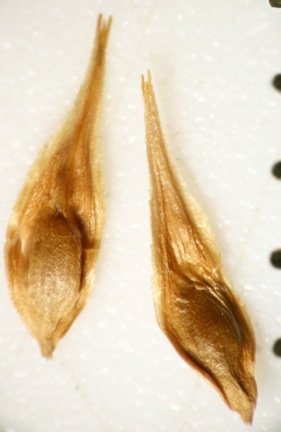

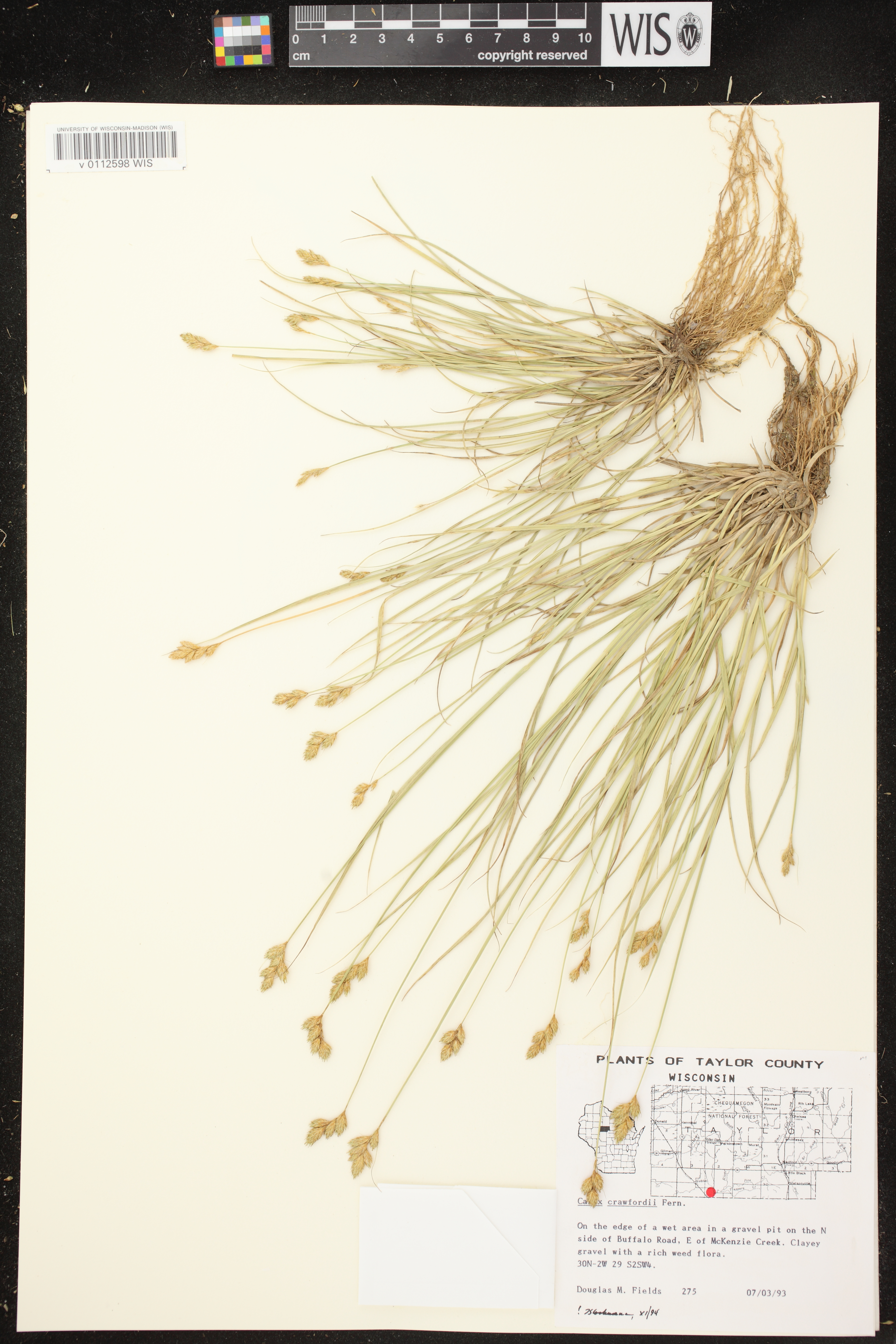

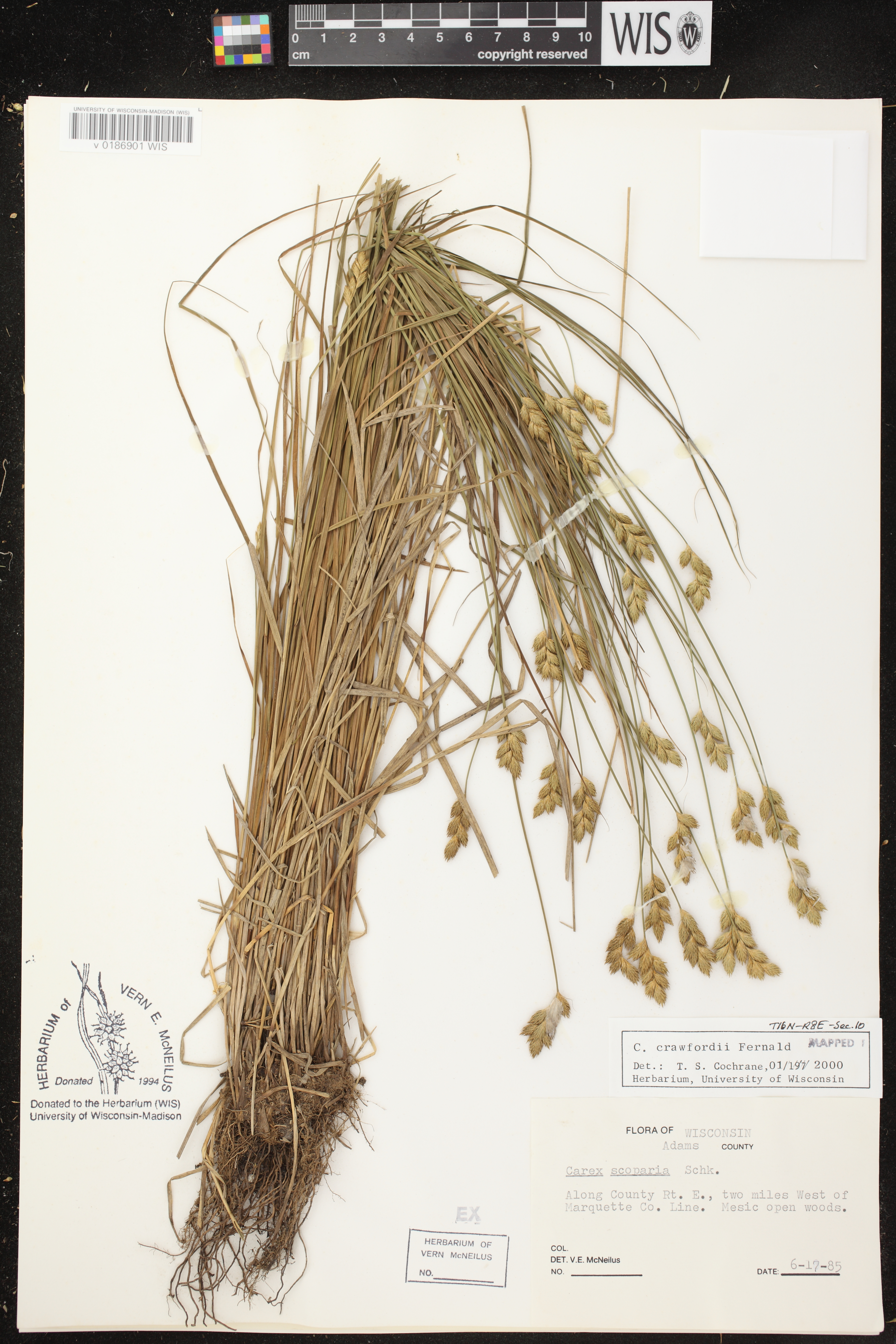

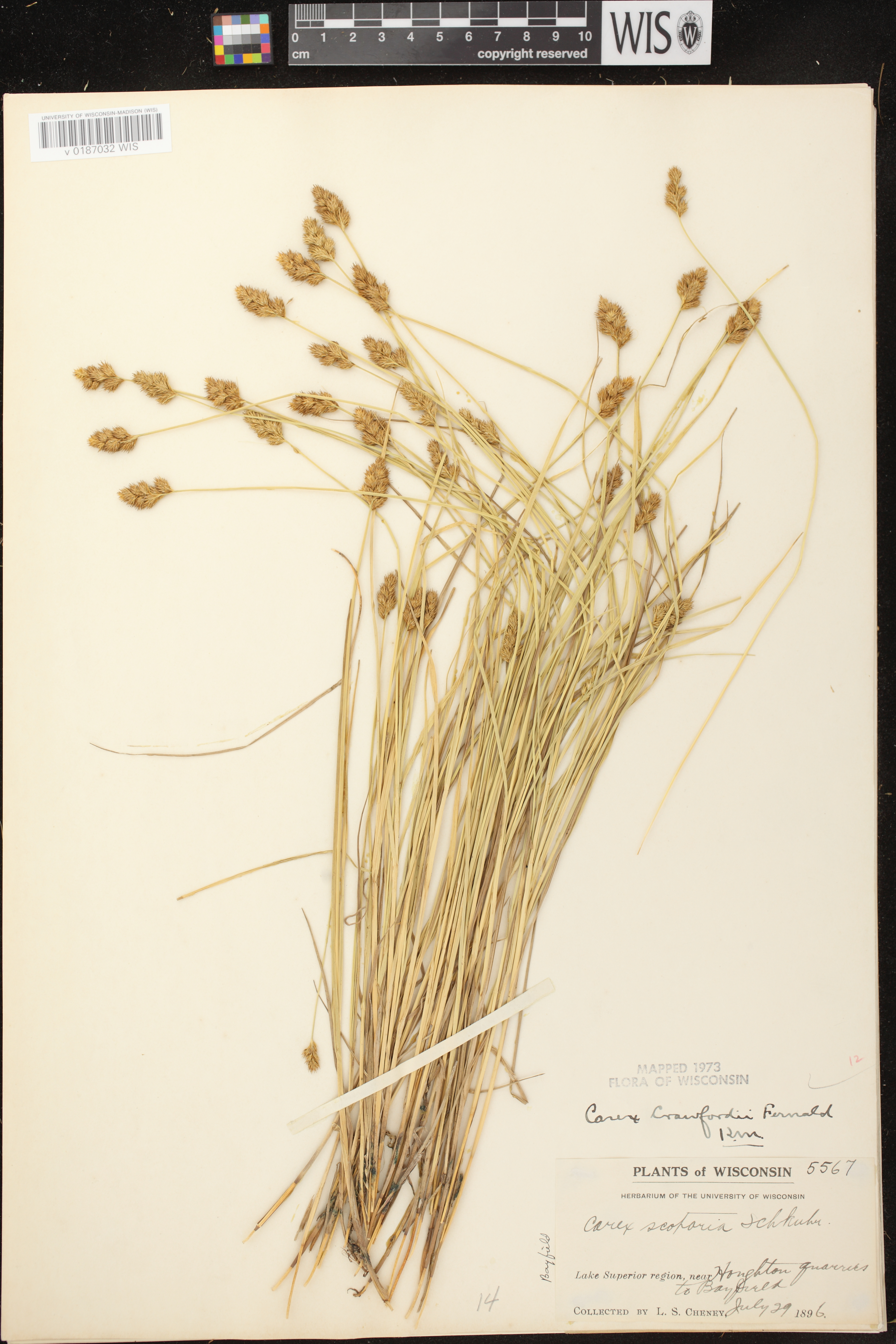

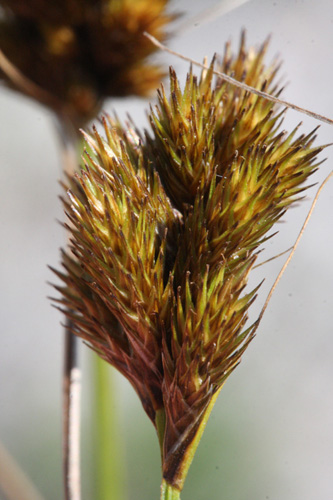

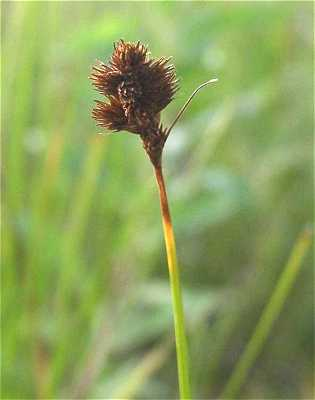

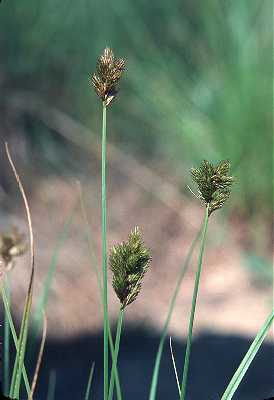

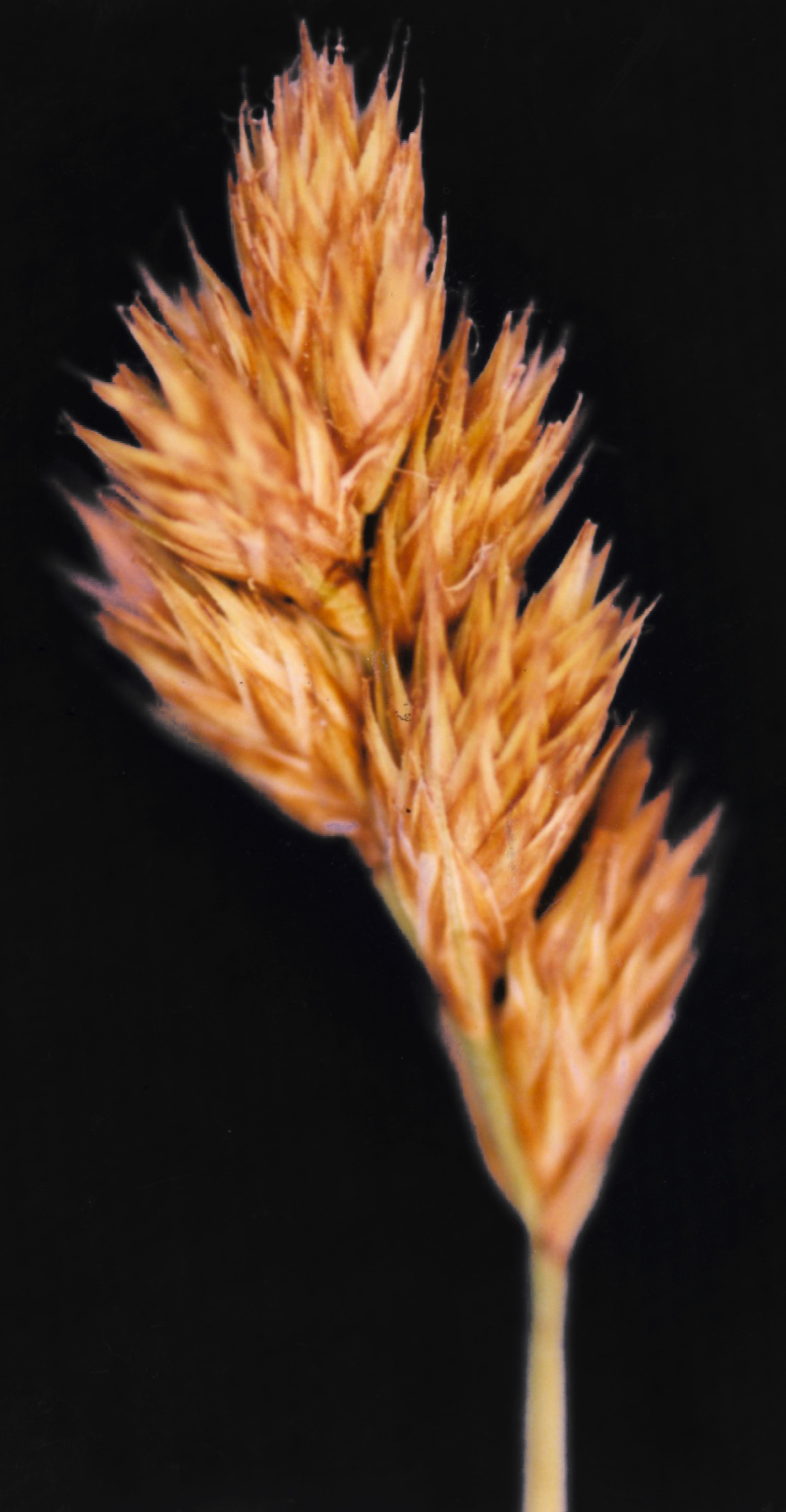

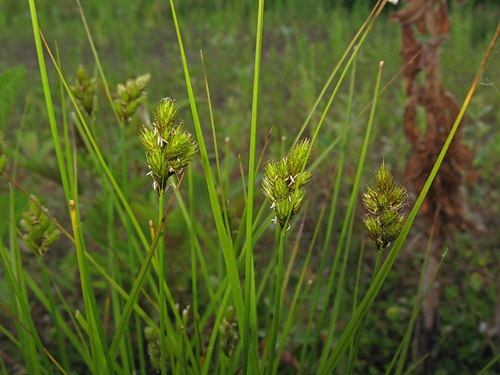

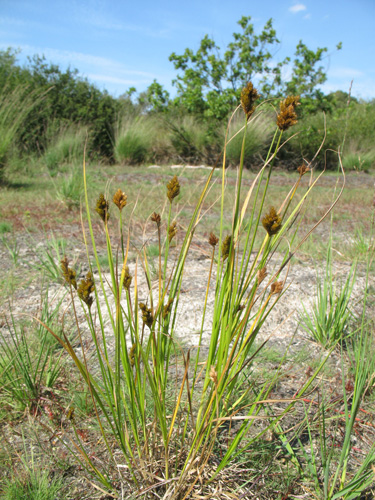

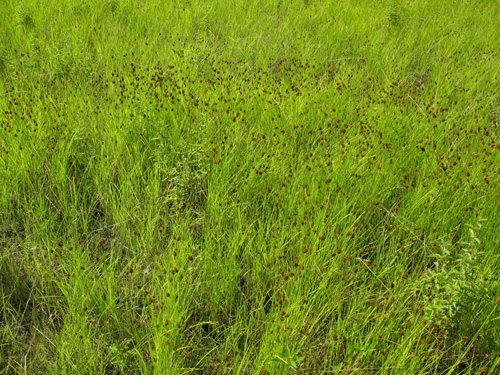

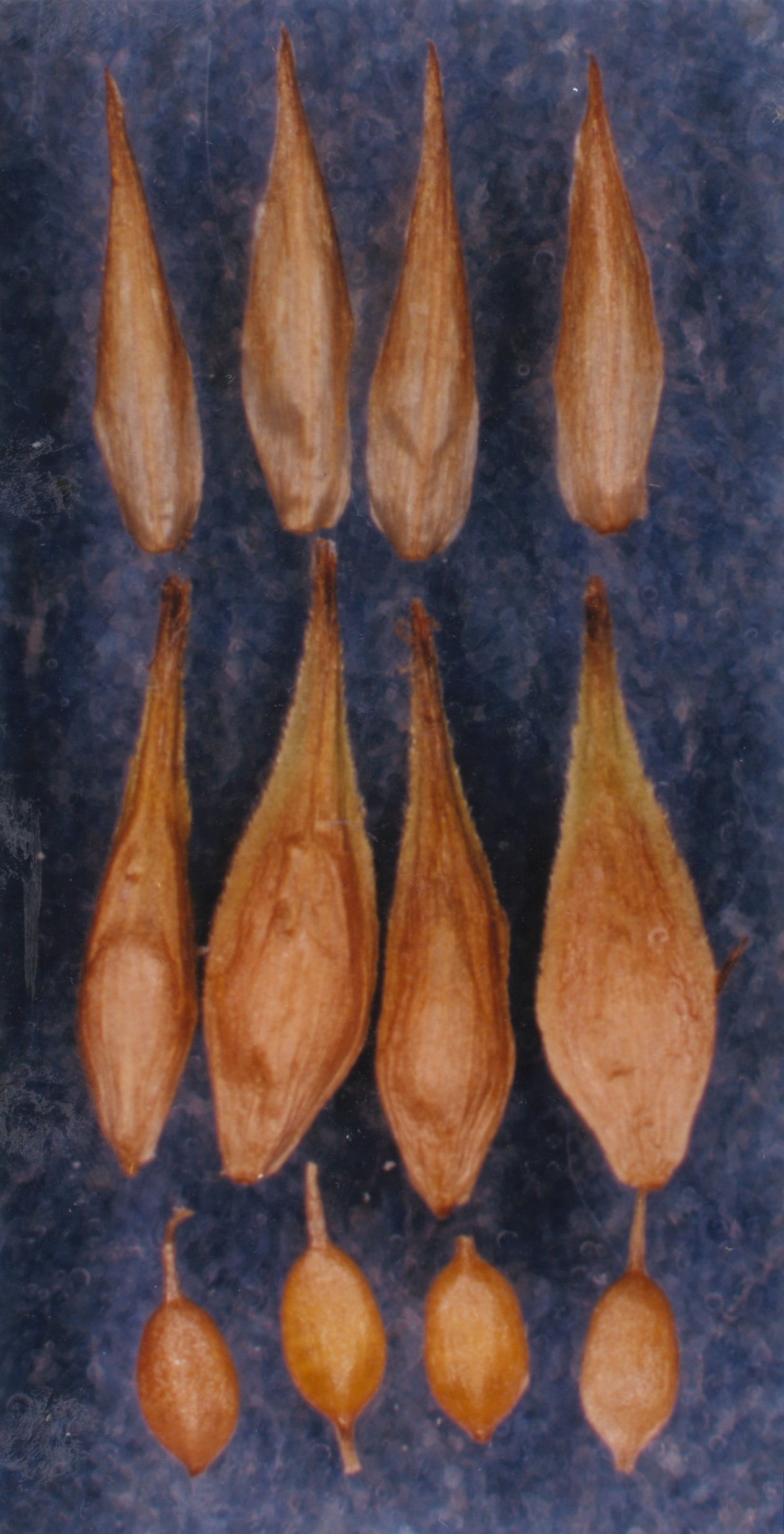
