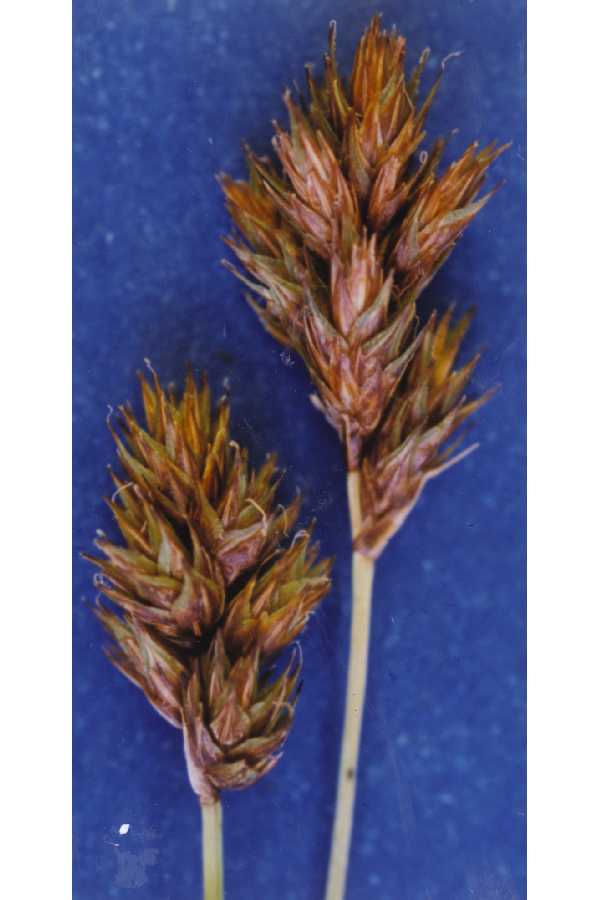

Scientific classification
- Kingdom: Plantae
- Clade: Tracheophytes
- Clade: Angiosperms
- Clade: Monocots
- Clade: Commelinids
- Order: Poales
- Family: Cyperaceae
- Genus: Carex
- Subgenus: Carex subg. Vignea
- Section: Carex sect. Ovales
- Species: C. mariposana

Binomial name
- Carex mariposana L.H.Bailey & Mack.

Synonyms
- Carex paucifructus

= Carex mariposana =

Species of grass-like plant

Carex mariposana is a species of sedge known by the common name Mariposa sedge.

== Description ==
Carex mariposana produces dense clumps of stems up to about 90 centimeters in maximum height and narrow leaves up to about 30 centimeters long. The inflorescence is a dense or open cluster of gold, brown, or reddish spikes. The fruit is covered with a sac called a perigynium which is generally greenish or coppery brown, veined, and winged.

== Distribution and habitat ==
This sedge is native to the Sierra Nevada of California and far western Nevada, where it grows in moist areas such as meadows.
