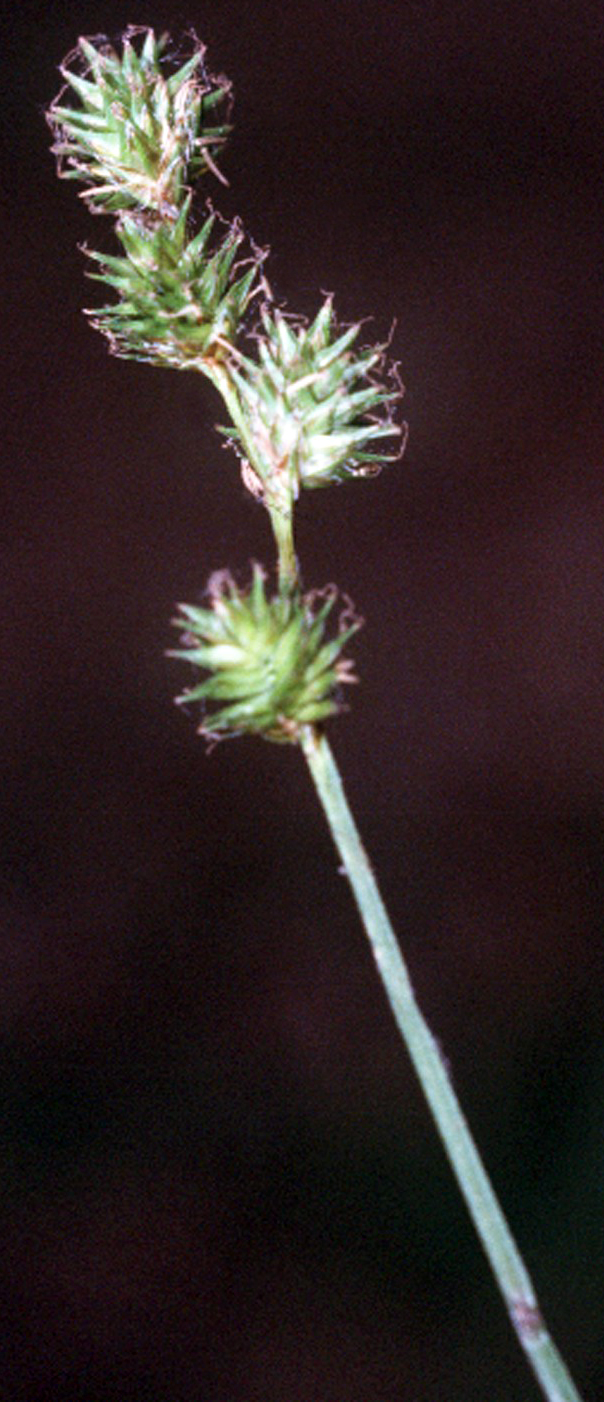

Scientific classification
- Kingdom: Plantae
- Clade: Tracheophytes
- Clade: Angiosperms
- Clade: Monocots
- Clade: Commelinids
- Order: Poales
- Family: Cyperaceae
- Genus: Carex
- Subgenus: Carex subg. Vignea
- Section: Carex sect. Ovales
- Species: C. festucacea

Binomial name
- Carex festucacea Schkuhr ex Willd.

= Carex festucacea =

Species of grass-like plant

Carex festucacea, or fescue sedge, is a species of sedge that lives in eastern North America. It has been described as "a soft, gray green, wisp, to 2', with narrow leaves and somewhat taller stems, topped by an interrupted spike, with lower spikelets, shaped a bit like an overflowing ice cream cone. The spike axis is often arched at the summit, but the alternating spikelets around the axis create a zig zag appearance. The seed sacs have a humped shoulder."
