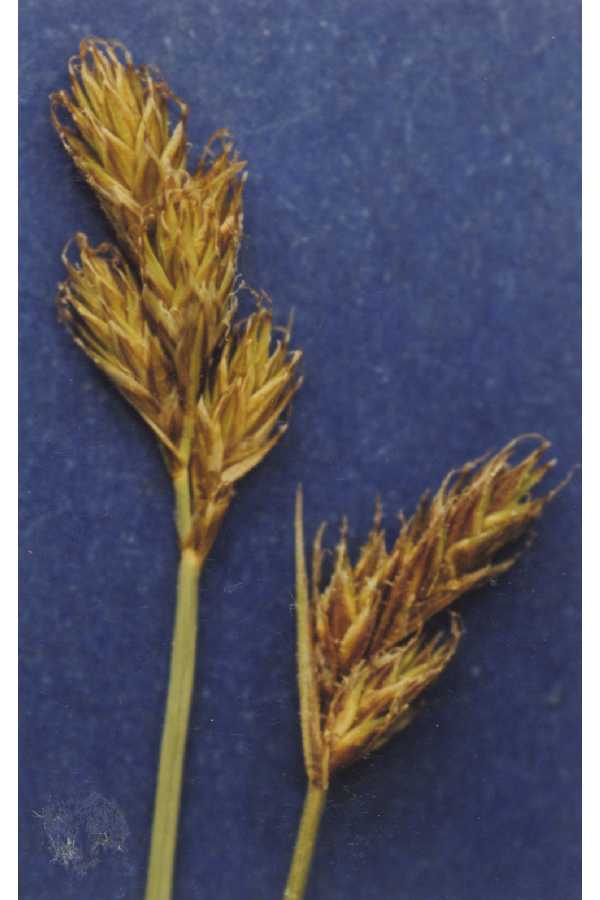

Scientific classification
- Kingdom: Plantae
- Clade: Tracheophytes
- Clade: Angiosperms
- Clade: Monocots
- Clade: Commelinids
- Order: Poales
- Family: Cyperaceae
- Genus: Carex
- Subgenus: Carex subg. Vignea
- Section: Carex sect. Ovales
- Species: C. leporinella

Binomial name
- Carex leporinella Mack.

= Carex leporinella =

Species of grass-like plant

Carex leporinella is a species of sedge known by the common name Sierra hare sedge.

== Distribution ==
This sedge is native to the western United States from California, such as the Sierra Nevada, to Wyoming, where it grows in moist mountain habitats, such as meadows.

== Description ==
Carex leporinella produces dense clumps of thin stems up to about 30 centimeters tall. There are a few leaves at each stem, each very narrow and generally folded or rolled.

The open inflorescence is a cluster of several golden to brown spikes, their flowers covered with reddish-brown, white-edged scales. The fruit is coated in a winged, curved, light-colored sac called a perigynium.
