= Carex shinnersii =

Scientific classification
- Kingdom: Plantae
- Clade: Tracheophytes
- Clade: Angiosperms
- Clade: Monocots
- Clade: Commelinids
- Order: Poales
- Family: Cyperaceae
- Genus: Carex
- Subgenus: Carex subg. Vignea
- Section: Carex sect. Ovales
- Species: C. shinnersii

Binomial name
- Carex shinnersii P.Rothr. & Reznicek

Species of grass-like plant

Carex shinnersii is a species of sedge described in 2001. It is native to North America, found in Arkansas, Kansas, Oklahoma, and Texas.

The species is named for Lloyd Herbert Shinners.
