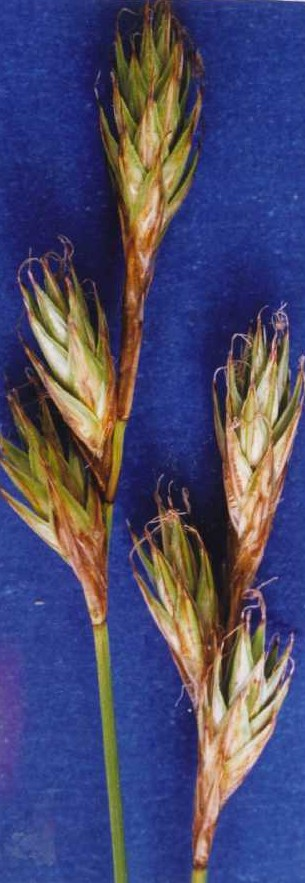

Scientific classification
- Kingdom: Plantae
- Clade: Tracheophytes
- Clade: Angiosperms
- Clade: Monocots
- Clade: Commelinids
- Order: Poales
- Family: Cyperaceae
- Genus: Carex
- Subgenus: Carex subg. Vignea
- Section: Carex sect. Ovales
- Species: C. petasata

Binomial name
- Carex petasata Dewey

Synonyms
- Carex liddonii

= Carex petasata =

Species of grass-like plant

Carex petasata is a species of sedge known by the common name Liddon sedge.

== Distribution ==
This sedge is native to much of western North America, from Alaska and northwestern Canada to California and to New Mexico, where it grows in several habitat types, including dry and wet, and low to high elevation, woodland and grassland.

== Description ==
Carex petasata produces dense clumps of stems up to about 85 centimeters in maximum height with several leaves per stem measuring up to 30 or 40 centimeters long.

The inflorescence is a light-colored open bundle of distinct flower spikes. The scale covering the female flower and the perigynium on the fruit are generally of pale color, white to cream to light brown.
