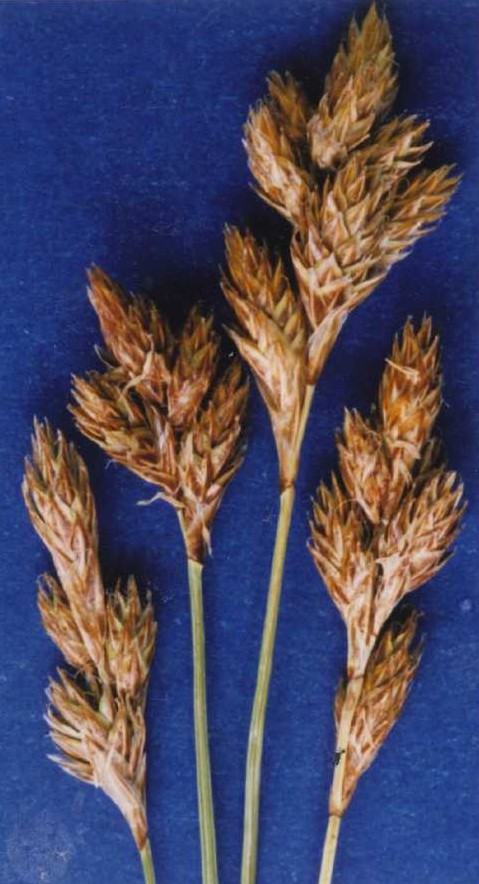

Scientific classification
- Kingdom: Plantae
- Clade: Tracheophytes
- Clade: Angiosperms
- Clade: Monocots
- Clade: Commelinids
- Order: Poales
- Family: Cyperaceae
- Genus: Carex
- Subgenus: Carex subg. Vignea
- Section: Carex sect. Ovales
- Species: C. phaeocephala

Binomial name
- Carex phaeocephala Piper

= Carex phaeocephala =

Species of grass-like plant

Carex phaeocephala is a species of sedge known by the common name dunhead sedge.

== Distribution ==
This sedge is native to much of western North America, from Alaska to California to New Mexico, where it grows from foothills to high elevation habitats, including areas of alpine climate, generally in rocky soils.

== Description ==
Carex phaeocephala produces dense clumps of stems up to about 45 centimeters in maximum height with several narrow, channeled leaves up to about 20 centimeters long.

The dense or open inflorescence contains several spikes of flowers. Female flowers have scales which are greenish or brown-orange with narrow pale edges. The perigynium covering the fruit has a dark center and greenish margins.
