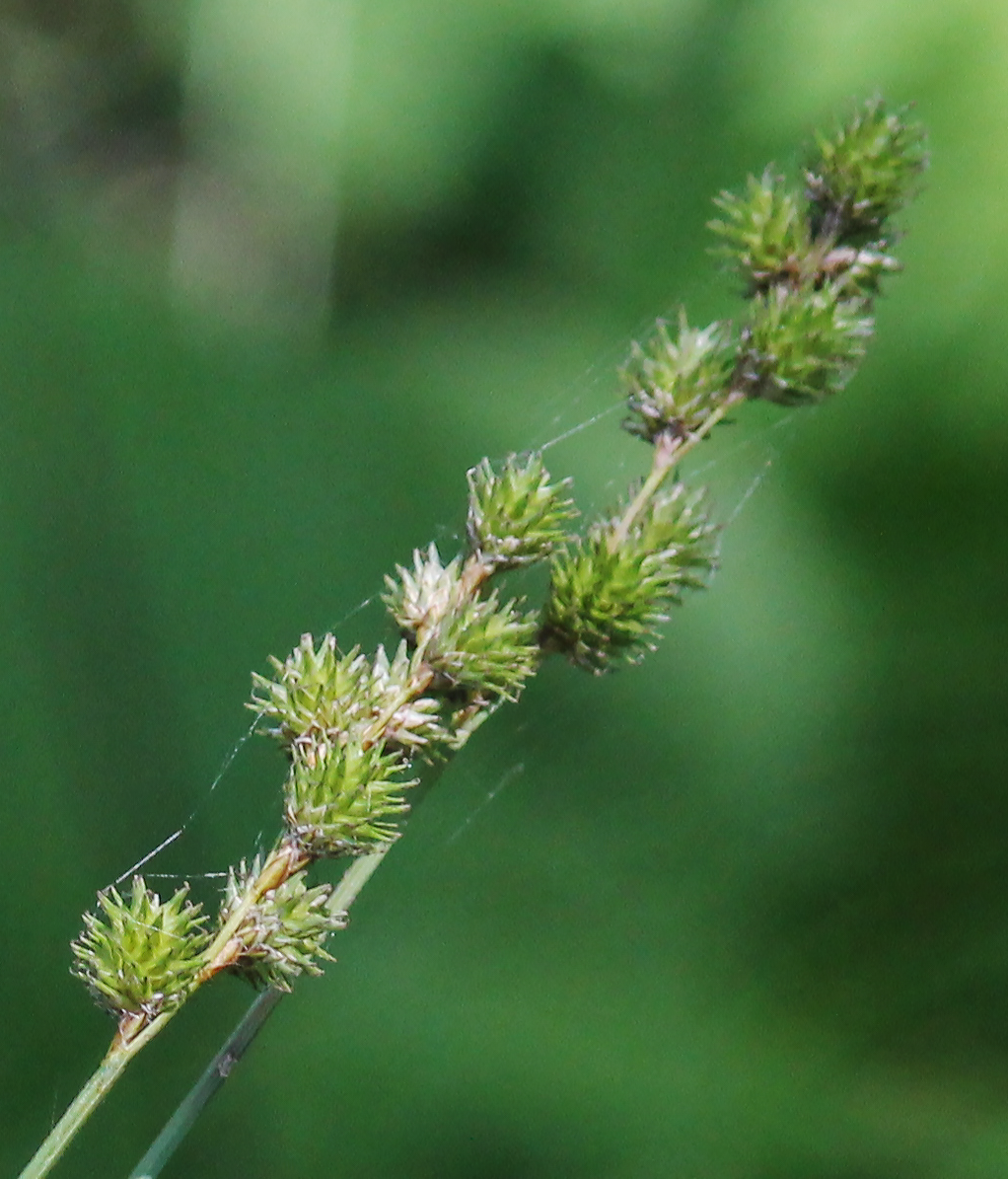

Conservation status
- Least Concern (IUCN 3.1)

Scientific classification
- Kingdom: Plantae
- Clade: Tracheophytes
- Clade: Angiosperms
- Clade: Monocots
- Clade: Commelinids
- Order: Poales
- Family: Cyperaceae
- Genus: Carex
- Subgenus: Carex subg. Vignea
- Section: Carex sect. Ovales
- Species: C. normalis

Binomial name
- Carex normalis Mack.

= Carex normalis =

Species of grass-like plant

Carex normalis, the greater straw sedge, is a species of sedge that was first described by Kenneth Mackenzie in 1919.
