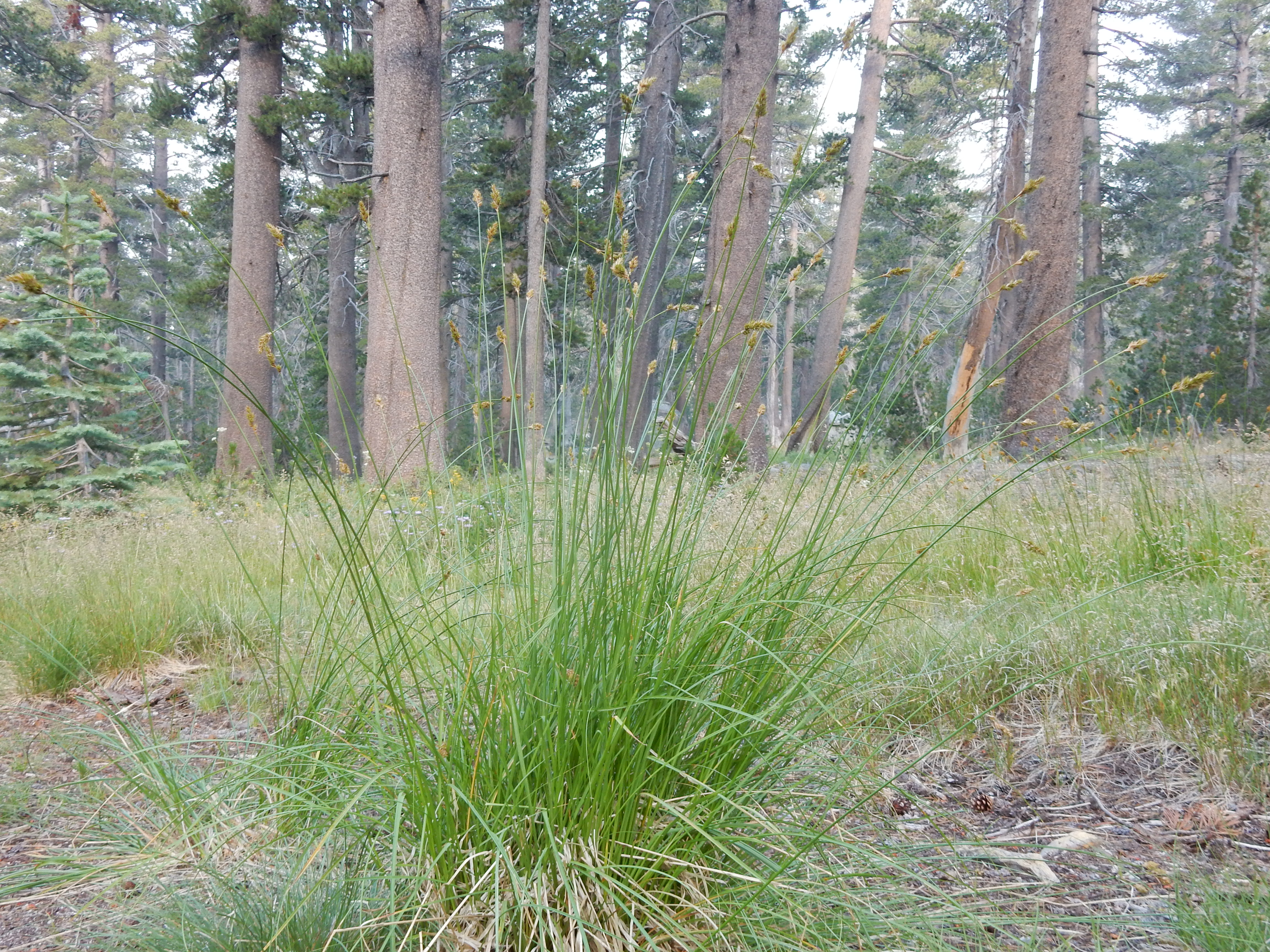

Scientific classification
- Kingdom: Plantae
- Clade: Tracheophytes
- Clade: Angiosperms
- Clade: Monocots
- Clade: Commelinids
- Order: Poales
- Family: Cyperaceae
- Genus: Carex
- Subgenus: Carex subg. Vignea
- Section: Carex sect. Ovales
- Species: C. pachystachya

Binomial name
- Carex pachystachya Cham. ex Steud.

Synonyms
- Carex multimoda Carex pyrophila

= Carex pachystachya =

Chamisso sedge

Species of plant

Carex pachystachya is a species of sedge known by the common name Chamisso sedge.

It is native to western North America from Alaska to Saskatchewan to California. It grows in dry to wet areas in many types of forest and grassland habitat.

== Description ==
Carex pachystachya produces dense clumps of erect stems up to 1.2 metres (3.9 ft) in maximum height.

The inflorescence is a dense or open cluster of several spikes of flowers. The pistillate flowers are covered in reddish or brown bracts.

The fruit is coated in a sac called a perigynium which is brown or coppery with a metallic sheen and a long dark tip.
