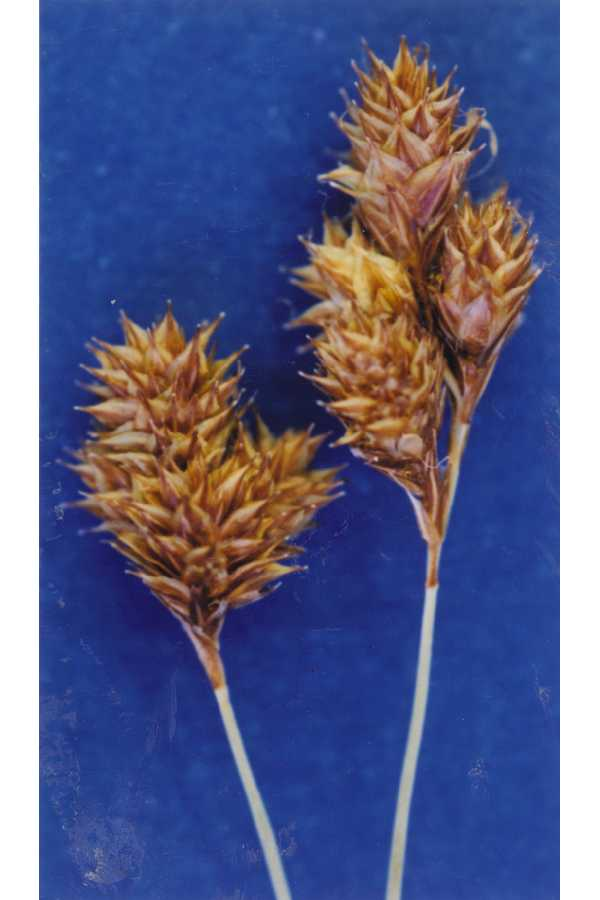

Scientific classification
- Kingdom: Plantae
- Clade: Tracheophytes
- Clade: Angiosperms
- Clade: Monocots
- Clade: Commelinids
- Order: Poales
- Family: Cyperaceae
- Genus: Carex
- Subgenus: Carex subg. Vignea
- Section: Carex sect. Ovales
- Species: C. proposita

Binomial name
- Carex proposita Mack.

= Carex proposita =

Species of grass-like plant

Carex proposita is a species of sedge known by the common name Great Smoky Mountain sedge. It has a scattered distribution in parts of the western United States, including Washington, Idaho, and California. It was named for the Smoky Mountains of Idaho, not the Great Smoky Mountains, where it does not occur. This sedge produces low, dense clumps of stems under 35 centimeters tall. The inflorescence is a dense or open bundle of rounded or oval brown flower spikes. The fruit is coated in a veined perigynium with a white tip.
