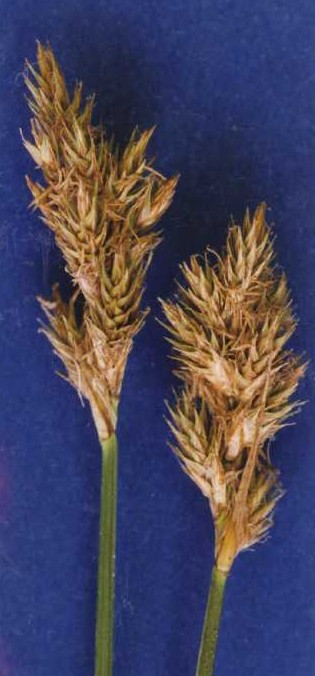

Scientific classification
- Kingdom: Plantae
- Clade: Tracheophytes
- Clade: Angiosperms
- Clade: Monocots
- Clade: Commelinids
- Order: Poales
- Family: Cyperaceae
- Genus: Carex
- Subgenus: Carex subg. Vignea
- Section: Carex sect. Ovales
- Species: C. specifica

Binomial name
- Carex specifica L.H.Bailey

= Carex specifica =

Species of grass-like plant

Carex specifica is a species of sedge known by the common name narrowfruit sedge.

== Description ==
Carex specifica produces dense clumps of stems up to about 85 centimeters in maximum height. The inflorescence is a dense green to gold cluster of flower spikes up to 5 centimeters long. The fruit is enclosed in a very narrow, pointed green to straw colored perigynium.
