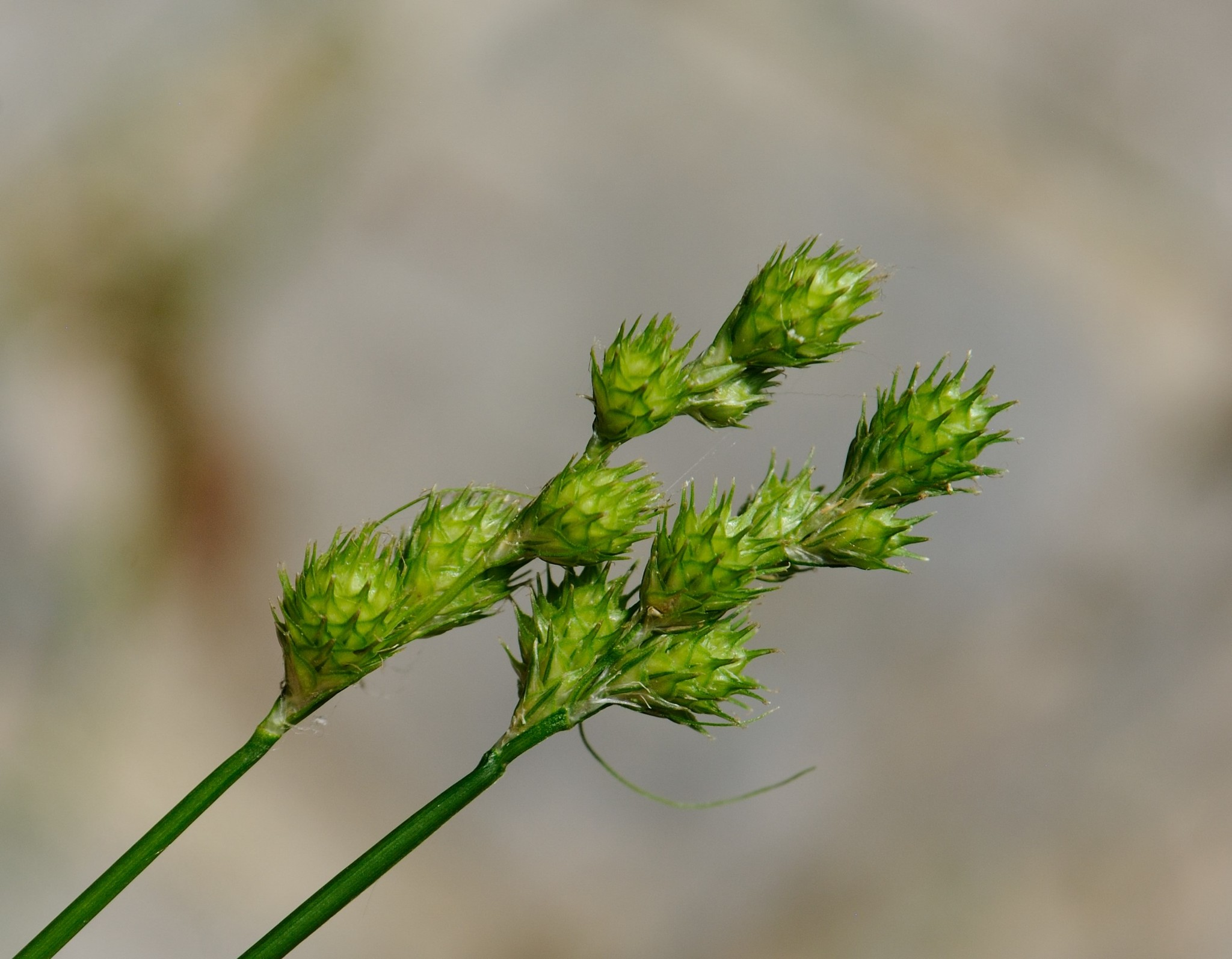
- Greenwhite sedge photographed in New York

Scientific classification
- Kingdom: Plantae
- Clade: Tracheophytes
- Clade: Angiosperms
- Clade: Monocots
- Clade: Commelinids
- Order: Poales
- Family: Cyperaceae
- Genus: Carex
- Subgenus: Carex subg. Vignea
- Section: Carex sect. Ovales
- Species: C. albolutescens

Binomial name
- Carex albolutescens Schwein.

= Carex albolutescens =

Species of grass-like plant

Carex albolutescens, known as greenish-white sedge or greenwhite sedge is a species of sedge native primarily to the lower Midwest and Eastern United States. C. albolutescens grows in wetlands, with an affinity toward acidic soils in swamps and woodlands.
