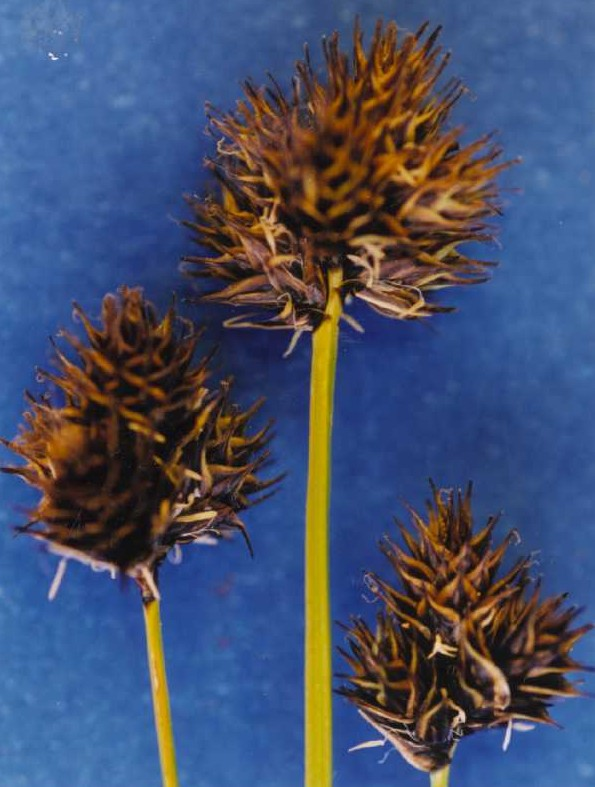

Scientific classification
- Kingdom: Plantae
- Clade: Tracheophytes
- Clade: Angiosperms
- Clade: Monocots
- Clade: Commelinids
- Order: Poales
- Family: Cyperaceae
- Genus: Carex
- Subgenus: Carex subg. Vignea
- Section: Carex sect. Ovales
- Species: C. haydeniana

Binomial name
- Carex haydeniana Olney

Synonyms
- Carex nubicola

= Carex haydeniana =

Species of grass-like plant

Carex haydeniana is a species of sedge known by the common name cloud sedge.

It is native to western North America from British Columbia and Alberta south to California and New Mexico. It grows in moist, rocky areas in subalpine and alpine climates.

== Description ==
Carex haydeniana produces clumps of drooping to decumbent stems up to 30 or 40 centimeters long, often much shorter. There are a few flat leaves per stem, each up to about 16 centimeters long.

The inflorescence is a dense dark brown spherical cluster of indistinct spikelets.
