= Carex ozarkana =

Conservation status
- Apparently Secure (NatureServe)

Scientific classification
- Kingdom: Plantae
- Clade: Tracheophytes
- Clade: Angiosperms
- Clade: Monocots
- Clade: Commelinids
- Order: Poales
- Family: Cyperaceae
- Genus: Carex
- Species: C. ozarkana

Binomial name
- Carex ozarkana P.Rothr. & Reznicek

Species of flowering plant

Carex ozarkana, the Ozark sedge, is a species of flowering plant in the family Cyperaceae, native to the U.S. states of Oklahoma, Texas, Arkansas, and Louisiana.

== Description ==
A perennial forming loose tufts and reaching 110 cm (43 in), it is found growing in permanently wet soils. The culms were between 45 and 95 centimeters in diameter. The vegetative culms are inconspicuous. The leaves sheaths are sometimes white mottled, green-veined near the collar, and Y-shaped. There are between 3 and 5 blades on culms. The inflorescence are either open or dense, yellowish-brown in color, and between 2.3 and 8.4 centimeters long and between 6 and 17 millimeters wide. The spikes are either conic or globose, between 8 and 19 millimeters long and 4.2 to 8.2 millimeters wide. The pistillate scales are either yellowish brown or reddish brown with a green mid-stripe, between 3 and 4 millimeters in diameter, and are shorter and narrower than the perigynia. The perigynia is either pale yellow or gold brown with green wings and beak. The achenes are elliptic, between 1.4 and 2 millimeters long, .9 to 1.2 millimeters wide, and 0.4 to 0.5 millimeters thick. It is a grass-like perennial that could grow up to 3 or 3 1/2 feet tall. The fruit type was an achene. The flower color ranged from yellow, to green, to brown. The fruiting period was between the months of May and June. The flowers are inconspicuous, and don't have an bloom time.
