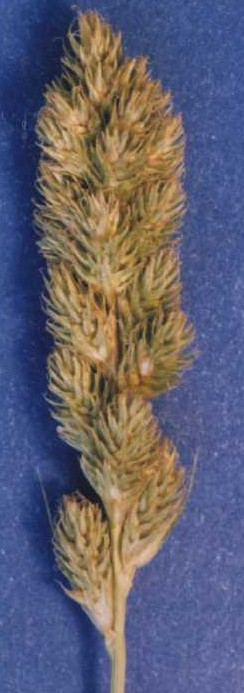

Scientific classification
- Kingdom: Plantae
- Clade: Tracheophytes
- Clade: Angiosperms
- Clade: Monocots
- Clade: Commelinids
- Order: Poales
- Family: Cyperaceae
- Genus: Carex
- Subgenus: Carex subg. Vignea
- Section: Carex sect. Ovales
- Species: C. fracta

Binomial name
- Carex fracta Mack.

= Carex fracta =

Species of grass-like plant

Carex fracta is a species of sedge known by the common name fragile sheath sedge. It is native to the western United States from Washington to California, where it grows in moist to dry areas in mountain forests and meadows. This sedge produces dense clumps of stems sometimes exceeding a meter tall. The leaves are attached to the stem with a characteristic thin, membranous sheath. The inflorescence is a dense or loose cluster of light green to gold spikes. Some spikes occur lower on the stem as well. The flowers are covered in light colored scales.
