= Carex tetrastachya =

Scientific classification
- Kingdom: Plantae
- Clade: Tracheophytes
- Clade: Angiosperms
- Clade: Monocots
- Clade: Commelinids
- Order: Poales
- Family: Cyperaceae
- Genus: Carex
- Species: C. tetrastachya

Binomial name
- Carex tetrastachya Scheele

Synonyms
- Carex brittoniana J.M.Coult.; Carex straminea var. maxima L.H.Bailey

Species of flowering plant

Carex tetrastachya is a species of sedge (family Cyperaceae), native to the U.S. states of New Mexico, Texas, Oklahoma, and Louisiana. It prefers to grow in sandy loam or clay soils in low-lying or otherwise moist areas.
