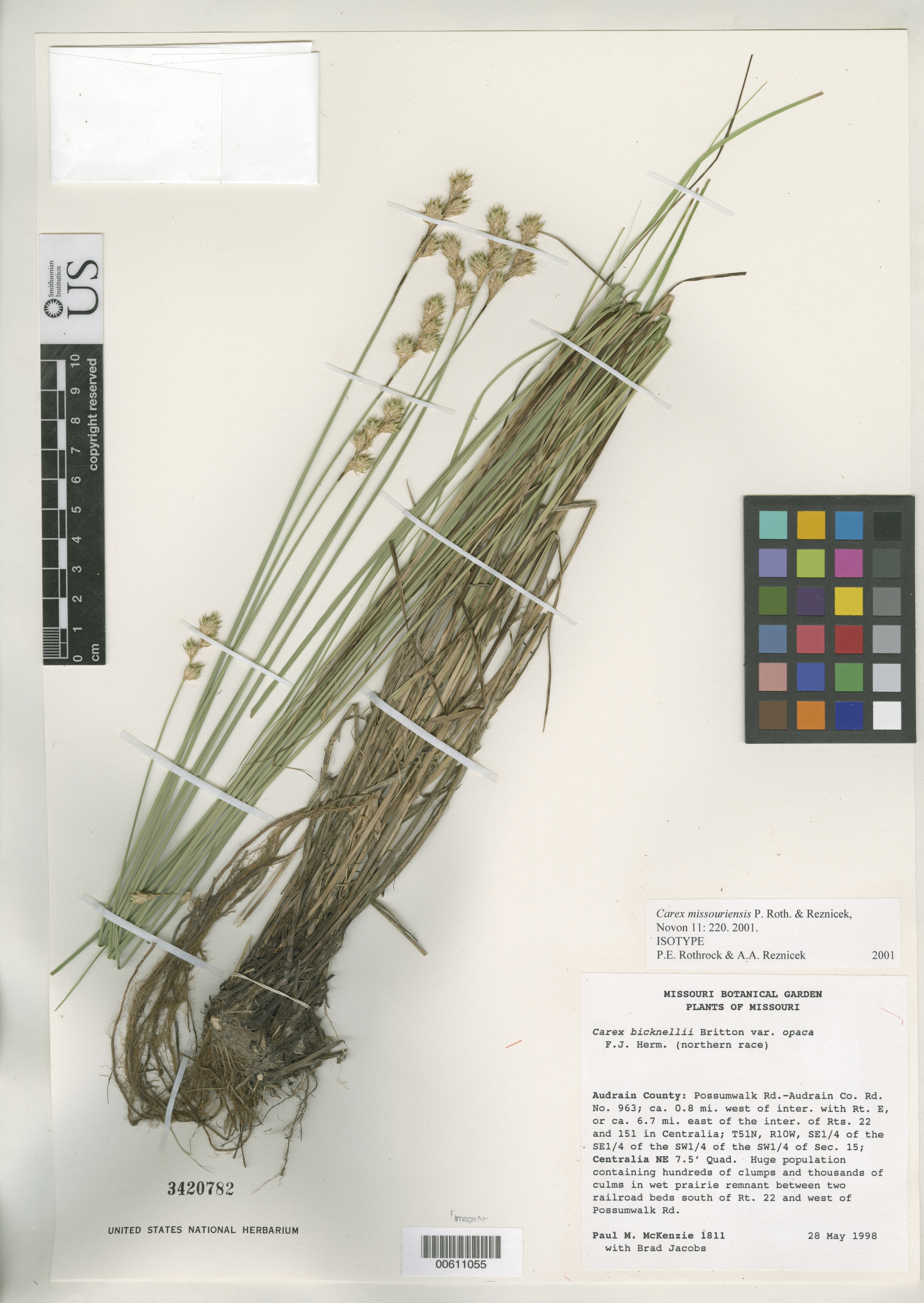

Scientific classification
- Kingdom: Plantae
- Clade: Tracheophytes
- Clade: Angiosperms
- Clade: Monocots
- Clade: Commelinids
- Order: Poales
- Family: Cyperaceae
- Genus: Carex
- Species: C. missouriensis

Binomial name
- Carex missouriensis P.Rothr. & Reznicek

Synonyms
- Carex straminea var. meadii Boott

= Carex missouriensis =

Species of grass-like plant

Carex missouriensis is a species of sedge in the family Cyperaceae, native to the US states of Nebraska, Kansas, Iowa, Missouri, Illinois, and Indiana. It is typically found in swales in surviving patches of prairie.
