= Carex xerantica =

Scientific classification
- Kingdom: Plantae
- Clade: Tracheophytes
- Clade: Angiosperms
- Clade: Monocots
- Clade: Commelinids
- Order: Poales
- Family: Cyperaceae
- Genus: Carex
- Species: C. xerantica

Binomial name
- Carex xerantica L.H.Bailey

Synonyms
- Carex foenea var. xerantica (L.H.Bailey) Kük.

Species of grass-like plant

Carex xerantica, the dry sedge, dryland sedge, or white-scaled sedge, is a species of flowering plant in the family Cyperaceae, native to western and central Canada, and the north-central United States. It can be found in a wide variety of habitats, including meadows, prairies, open woodlands, bluffs, sandy or rocky areas, and even talus slopes.
