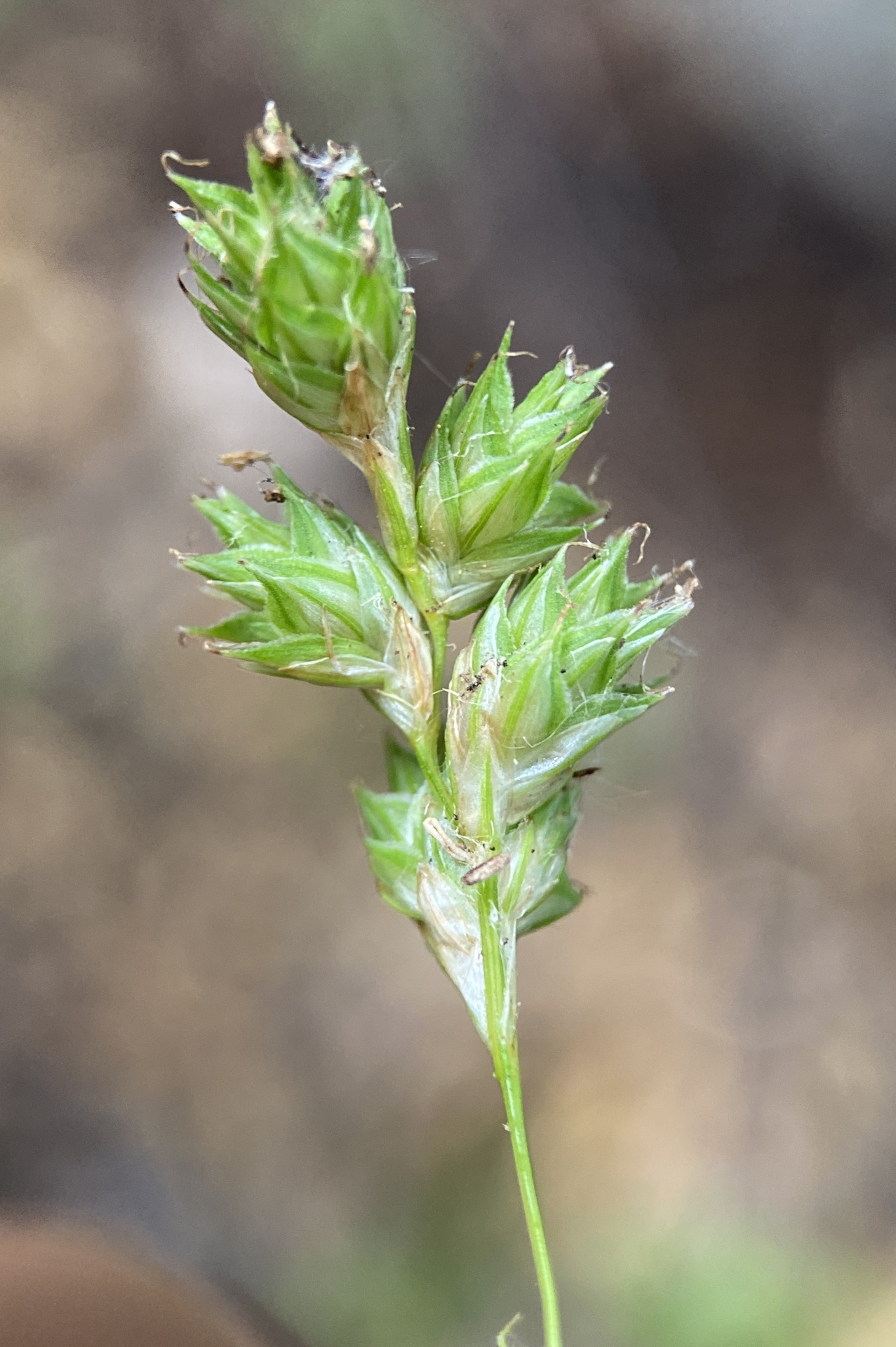

Scientific classification
- Kingdom: Plantae
- Clade: Tracheophytes
- Clade: Angiosperms
- Clade: Monocots
- Clade: Commelinids
- Order: Poales
- Family: Cyperaceae
- Genus: Carex
- Species: C. argyrantha

Binomial name
- Carex argyrantha Tuck. ex Boott

Synonyms
- Carex foenea var. perplexa L.H.Bailey

= Carex argyrantha =

Species of flowering plant

Carex argyrantha, the hay sedge, is a species of flowering plant in the family Cyperaceae. It is native to eastern Canada and the east-central and northeastern United States, and has gone extinct in Delaware. It typically grows in rocky woodlands and on sandstone ledges and has potential for use on green roofs.
