= Carex ebenea =

- In the High Uintas Wilderness
- Near Clinton Gulch Dam Reservoir

Conservation status
- Secure (NatureServe)

Scientific classification
- Kingdom: Plantae
- Clade: Tracheophytes
- Clade: Angiosperms
- Clade: Monocots
- Clade: Commelinids
- Order: Poales
- Family: Cyperaceae
- Genus: Carex
- Species: C. ebenea

Binomial name
- Carex ebenea Rydb.

Synonyms
- Carex festiva var. ebenea (Rydb.) J.K.Henry; Carex haydeniana var. ebenea (Rydb.) Kelso

Species of plant

Carex ebenea, the ebony sedge, is a species of flowering plant in the family Cyperaceae. It is native to the west-central United States. A rhizomatous perennial reaching 50 cm (20 in), it is typically found in high meadows at elevations from 2,700 to 3,700 m (9,000 to 12,000 ft).
