= Carex opaca =

Scientific classification
- Kingdom: Plantae
- Clade: Tracheophytes
- Clade: Angiosperms
- Clade: Monocots
- Clade: Commelinids
- Order: Poales
- Family: Cyperaceae
- Genus: Carex
- Species: C. opaca

Binomial name
- Carex opaca (F.J.Herm.) P.Rothr. & Reznicek

Species of grass-like plant

Carex opaca is a sedge that is native to northern central and south eastern parts of the United States including; Illinois, Kansas, Oklahoma, Missouri, Arkansas and Mississippi.

== See also ==
- List of Carex species
