= Carex vexans =

Scientific classification
- Kingdom: Plantae
- Clade: Tracheophytes
- Clade: Angiosperms
- Clade: Monocots
- Clade: Commelinids
- Order: Poales
- Family: Cyperaceae
- Genus: Carex
- Species: C. vexans

Binomial name
- Carex vexans F.J.Herm.

Species of grass-like plant

Carex vexans, also known as Florida hammock sedge, is a sedge that is native to Florida.

== See also ==
- List of Carex species
