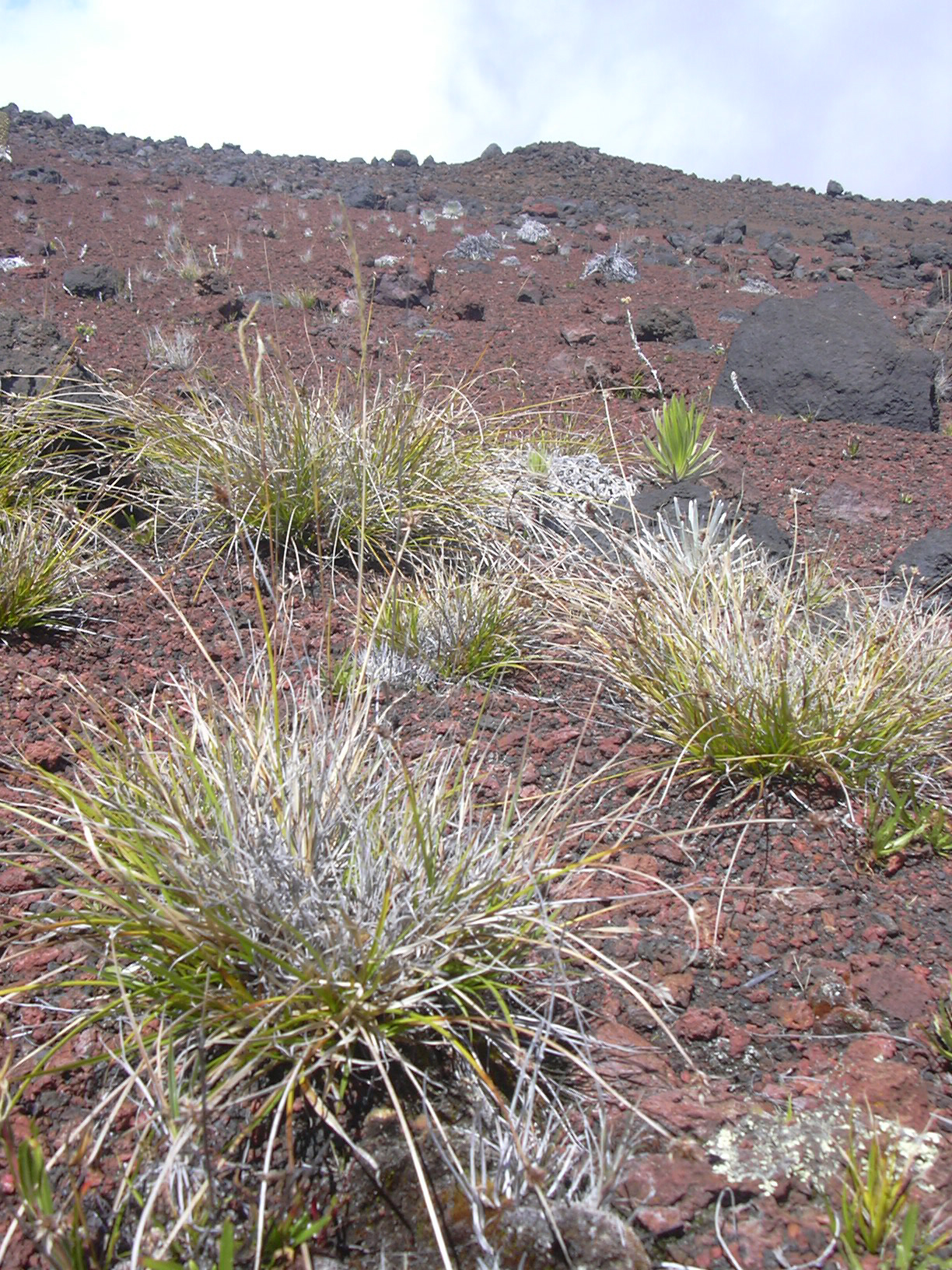
- In Maui
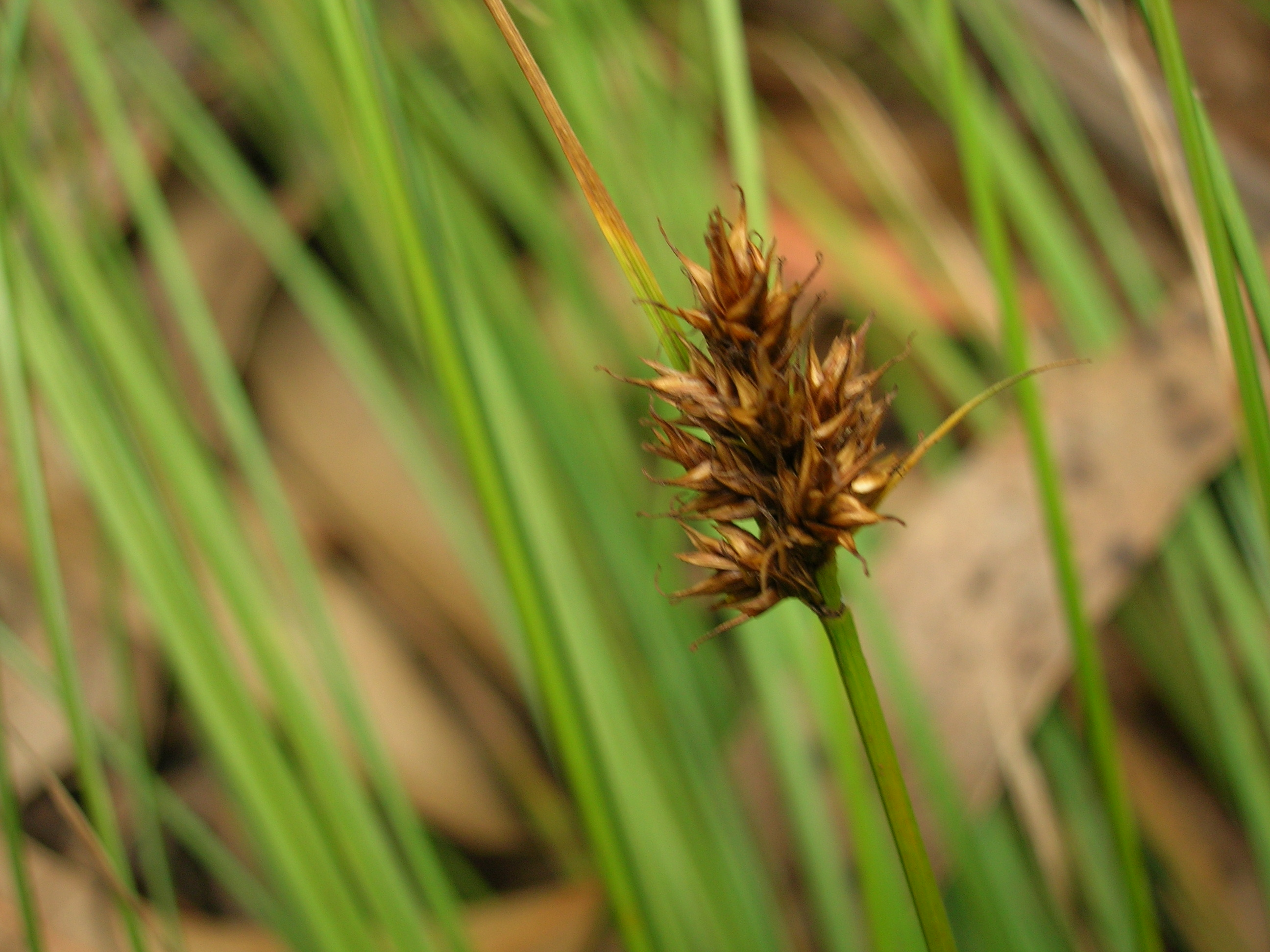
- Close-up of seedhead

Scientific classification
- Kingdom: Plantae
- Clade: Tracheophytes
- Clade: Angiosperms
- Clade: Monocots
- Clade: Commelinids
- Order: Poales
- Family: Cyperaceae
- Genus: Carex
- Species: C. subfusca

Binomial name
- Carex subfusca W.Boott

Synonyms
- List: Carex festiva var. gracilis Olney; Carex flaviceps Kük.; Carex macloviana f. bracteata (Kük.) Kük.; Carex macloviana var. bracteata Kük.; Carex macloviana var. gracilis (Olney) Kük.; Carex macloviana var. subfusca (W.Boott) Kük.; Carex macloviana subsp. subfusca (W.Boott) T.Koyama; Carex pachystachya var. gracilis (Olney) Mack.; Carex stenoptera Mack.; Carex teneriformis Mack.

= Carex subfusca =

Species of plant

Carex subfusca, variously called the rusty slender sedge, rusty sedge, or brown sedge, is a species of flowering plant in the family Cyperaceae, native to the Hawaiian Islands, the western United States, and Baja California. It is surmised that it came to Hawaii by being deposited by a bird (epizoochory).

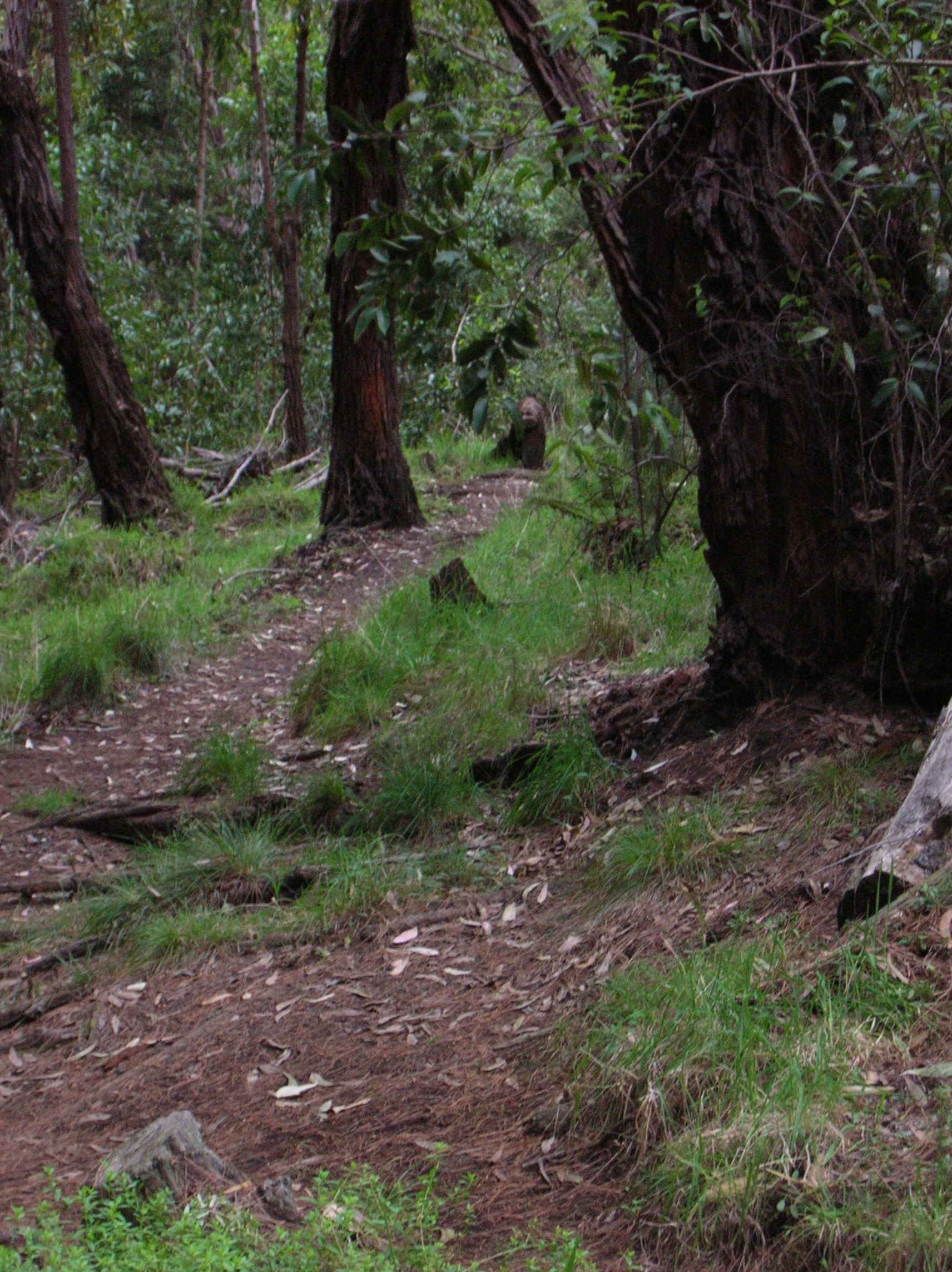
Beneath trees in Hawaii
