= Stephen Thayer Olney =

- Born: February 15, 1812; Burrillville, Rhode Island
- Died: 27 July 1878 (aged 66); Providence, Rhode Island

Stephen Thayer Olney (February 15, 1812 – July 27, 1878) was an American manufacturer and botanist with expertise in the genus Carex. He issued the exsiccata Carices Boreali-Americanae ex coll. variorum, distribuit S. T. Olney anno 1870.

The monotypic plant genus Olneya (Olneya tesota, desert ironwood) was named in his honor by his friend and fellow botanist Asa Gray.

The standard author abbreviation Olney is used to indicate this person as the author when citing a botanical name.
