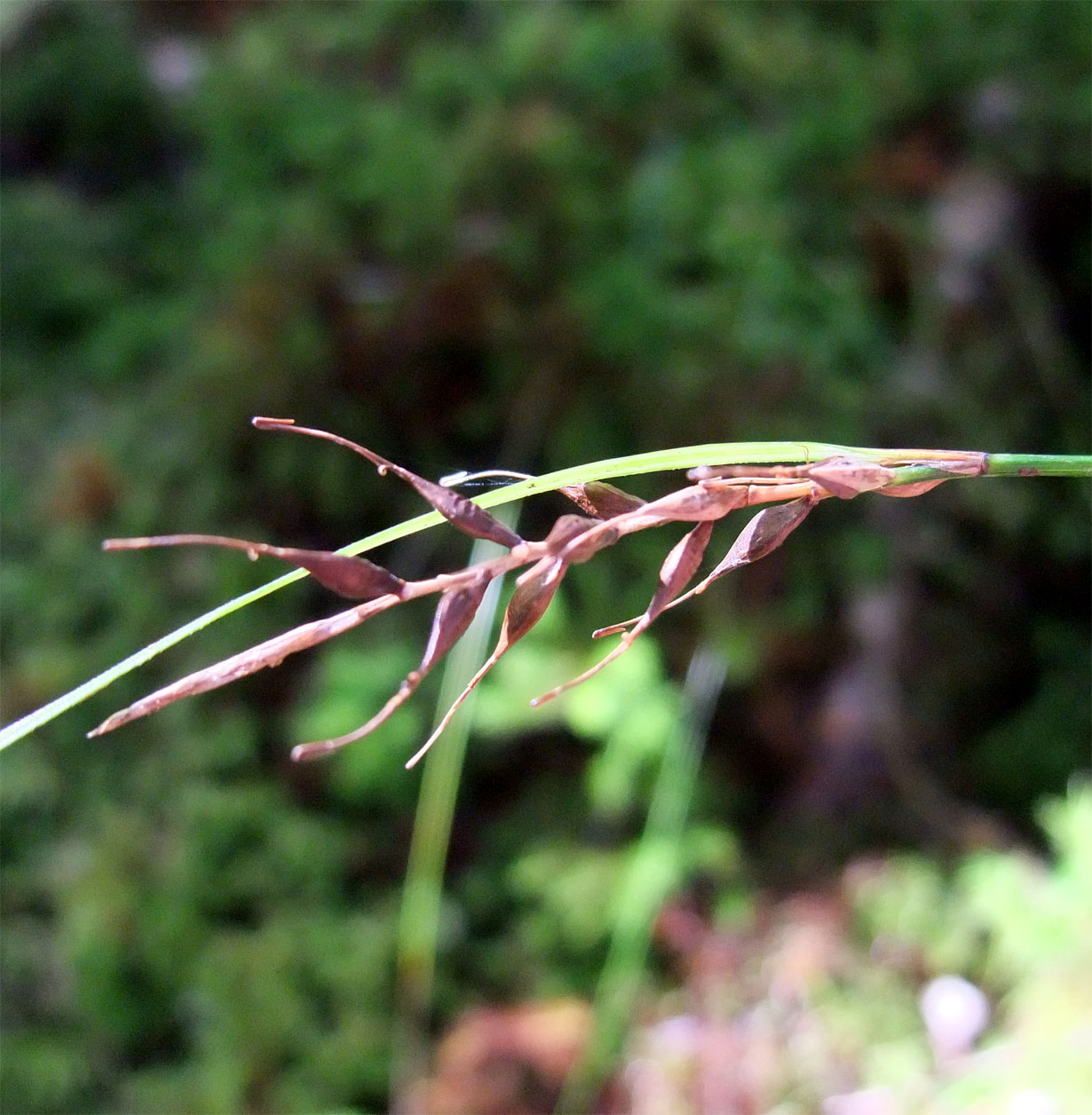

Scientific classification
- Kingdom: Plantae
- Clade: Tracheophytes
- Clade: Angiosperms
- Clade: Monocots
- Clade: Commelinids
- Order: Poales
- Family: Cyperaceae
- Genus: Uncinia; Pers.

Type species
- Uncinia australis Pers.

Synonyms
- Agistron Raf.

= Uncinia =

Genus of grass-like plants

Uncinia is a genus of flowering plants in the family Cyperaceae, known as hook-sedges in Australia and as hook grasses or bastard grasses in New Zealand. The genus is characterised by the presence of a long hook formed by an extension of the rachilla, which is used to attach the fruit to passing animals (epizoochory), especially birds, and it is this feature which gives the genus its name, from the Latin uncinus, meaning a hook or barb.

== Systematics ==
Uncinia is a "satellite genus" of the very large genus Carex, alongside other satellites such as Cymophyllus, Kobresia, Schoenoxiphium, Vesicarex. Uncinia seems to form a monophyletic group, with the most distinct species being U. kingii, a species which has sometimes been placed in the genus Carex. Similarly, Carex microglochin has sometimes been included in Uncinia, as U. microglochin.

== Distribution ==
Uncinia has a Gondwanan distribution, with most species found Australia, New Zealand and South America, as far north as Mexico and Jamaica. Of the 50–60 species, 30 are endemic to New Zealand, 6 are endemic to the east coast of Australia, and 4 are endemic to the Juan Fernández Islands. Smaller numbers of species are also found in New Guinea, Borneo, the Philippines, Hawaii, Tristan da Cunha, Kerguelen, Île Amsterdam, Île Saint-Paul, and the Prince Edward Islands, although none are known from the mainland of Africa. This distribution suggests that the genus had an origin in Antarctica.

It contains the following species:

- Uncinia affinis (C. B. Clarke) Hamlin – New Zealand
- Uncinia andina G. A. Wheeler – Argentina
- Uncinia angustifolia Hamlin – New Zealand
- Uncinia araucana G. A. Wheeler – Chile
- Uncinia aspericaulis G. A. Wheeler – Juan Fernández Islands
- Uncinia astonii Hamlin – New Zealand
- Uncinia aucklandica Hamlin – New Zealand
- Uncinia austroamericana G. A. Wheeler – Tierra del Fuego
- Uncinia banksii Boott – New Zealand
- Uncinia bracteosa Phil. – Chile
- Uncinia brevicaulis Thouars – Hawaii, South America, Falkland Islands, Tristan da Cunha, Juan Fernández Islands
- Uncinia caespitosa Boott – New Zealand
- Uncinia chilensis G. A. Wheeler – Chile
- Uncinia clavata (Kük.) Hamlin – New Zealand
- Uncinia compacta R. Br. – Australia
- Uncinia costata Kük. – Juan Fernández Islands
- Uncinia dawsonii Hamlin – New Caledonia
- Uncinia debilior F. Muell. – Lord Howe Island
- Uncinia dikei Nelmes – Marion Island
- Uncinia distans Col. ex Boott – New Zealand
- Uncinia divaricata Boott – New Zealand
- Uncinia douglasii Boott – Juan Fernández Islands
- Uncinia drucei Hamlin – New Zealand
- Uncinia ecuadorensis G. A. Wheeler & Goetgh. – Ecuador
- Uncinia egmontiana Hamlin – New Zealand
- Uncinia elegans (Kük.) Hamlin – New Zealand, Tasmania
- Uncinia erinacea Pers. – South America
- Uncinia ferruginea Boott – New Zealand
- Uncinia filiformis Boott – New Zealand
- Uncinia flaccida S. T. Blake – Victoria (Australia)
- Uncinia fuscovaginata Kük. – New Zealand
- Uncinia gracilenta Hamlin – New Zealand
- Uncinia hamata (Sw.) Urb. – Neotropics
- Uncinia hookeri Boott – New Zealand's subantarctic islands, Macquarie Island
- Uncinia involuta Hamlin – New Zealand
- Uncinia kingii R.Br. ex Boott – Chile
- Uncinia koyamai Gómez-Laur. – Costa Rica
- Uncinia lacustris G. A. Wheeler – Ecuador
- Uncinia laxiflora Petrie – New Zealand
- Uncinia lechleriana Steud. – Magellan Region
- Uncinia leptostachya Raoul – New Zealand
- Uncinia loliacea Phil. – Chile
- Uncinia longifructus (Kük.) Petrie – New Zealand
- Uncinia macloviformis G. A. Wheeler – Juan Fernández Islands
- Uncinia macrophylla Steud. – Chile
- Uncinia macrotricha Franch. – Patagonia
- Uncinia meridensis Steyerm. – Venezuela
- Uncinia multifaria Nees ex Boott – Chile
- Uncinia multifolia Boeckeler – Colombia
- Uncinia negeri Kük. – Chile
- Uncinia nemoralis K. L. Wilson – Australia
- Uncinia nervosa Boott – New Zealand, Tasmania
- Uncinia obtusifolia Boott – New Zealand
- Uncinia ohwiana Koyama – New Guinea
- Uncinia paludosa G. A. Wheeler & Goetgh. – Ecuador
- Uncinia perplexa Boott – Surville Cliffs (New Zealand)
- Uncinia phleoides (Cav.) Pers. – Juan Fernández Islands, South America
- Uncinia purpurata Petrie – New Zealand
- Uncinia rapaensis H. St. John – Tubuai
- Uncinia rubra Boott – New Zealand
- Uncinia rupestris Raoul – New Zealand
- Uncinia scabra Boott – New Zealand
- Uncinia scabriuscula G. A. Wheeler – Argentina, Chile
- Uncinia sclerophylla Nelmes – New Guinea
- Uncinia silvestris Hamlin – New Zealand
- Uncinia sinclairii Boott – New Zealand
- Uncinia smithii Phil. – South Georgia, Falkland Islands
- Uncinia strictissima Petrie – New Zealand
- Uncinia subsacculata G. A. Wheeler & Goetgh. – Ecuador
- Uncinia subtrigona Nelmes – Borneo, New Guinea
- Uncinia sulcata K. L. Wilson – Australia
- Uncinia tenella R. Br. – Australia
- Uncinia tenuifolia G. A. Wheeler & Goetgh. – Ecuador
- Uncinia tenuis Poeppig ex Kunth – Juan Fernández Islands, South America
- Uncinia uncinata (L. f.) Kük. – New Zealand, Hawaii
- Uncinia viridis (C. B. Clarke) Edgar – New Zealand
- Uncinia zotovii Hamlin – New Zealand
