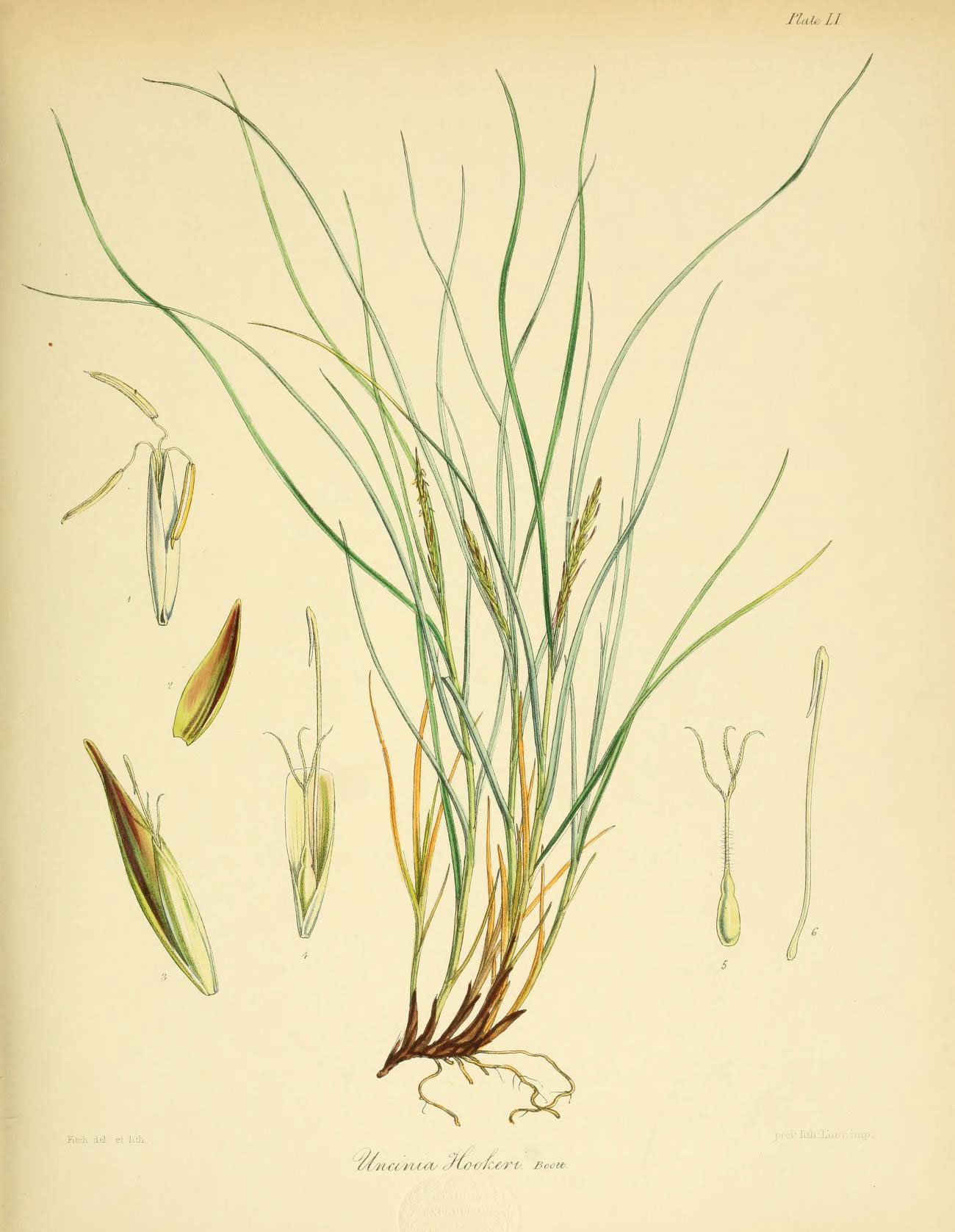
- Plate LI (artist: Fitch)

Conservation status
- Naturally Uncommon (NZ TCS)

Scientific classification
- Kingdom: Plantae
- Clade: Tracheophytes
- Clade: Angiosperms
- Clade: Monocots
- Clade: Commelinids
- Order: Poales
- Family: Cyperaceae
- Genus: Carex
- Species: C. erebus

Binomial name
- Carex erebus K.A.Ford

Synonyms
- Uncinia hookeri Boott; Uncinia riparia R.Br. var. hookeri (Boott) Kük.

= Carex erebus =

Species of grass-like plant

Carex erebus (common name - Hookers bastard grass) is a member of the sedge family and is found on the Antarctic Islands of Australia and New Zealand.

== Distribution ==
It is found on Macquarie Island (Australia), and in New Zealand on Stewart Island, Antipodes Island, Auckland Islands and Campbell Island.

== Taxonomy ==
Carex erebus was first described in 1844 by Francis Boott as Uncinia hookeri in Joseph Hooker's Flora Antarctica. In 2015, in order to make the genus Carex monophyletic, the genus, Uncinia, was sunk into Carex. The name, Carex hookeri had already been published in 1837 for another species. Hence a new species epithet was required: erebus was chosen, being the name of the ship (HMS Erebus) on which Hooker sailed on the Antarctic expedition of 1839-1843 when this species was first collected on the Auckland Islands.

== Conservation status ==
In both 2009 and 2012 it was deemed to be "At Risk - Naturally Uncommon" under the New Zealand Threat Classification System, and this New Zealand classification was reaffirmed in 2018 (due to its restricted range) but with a further comment that it is secure overseas.
