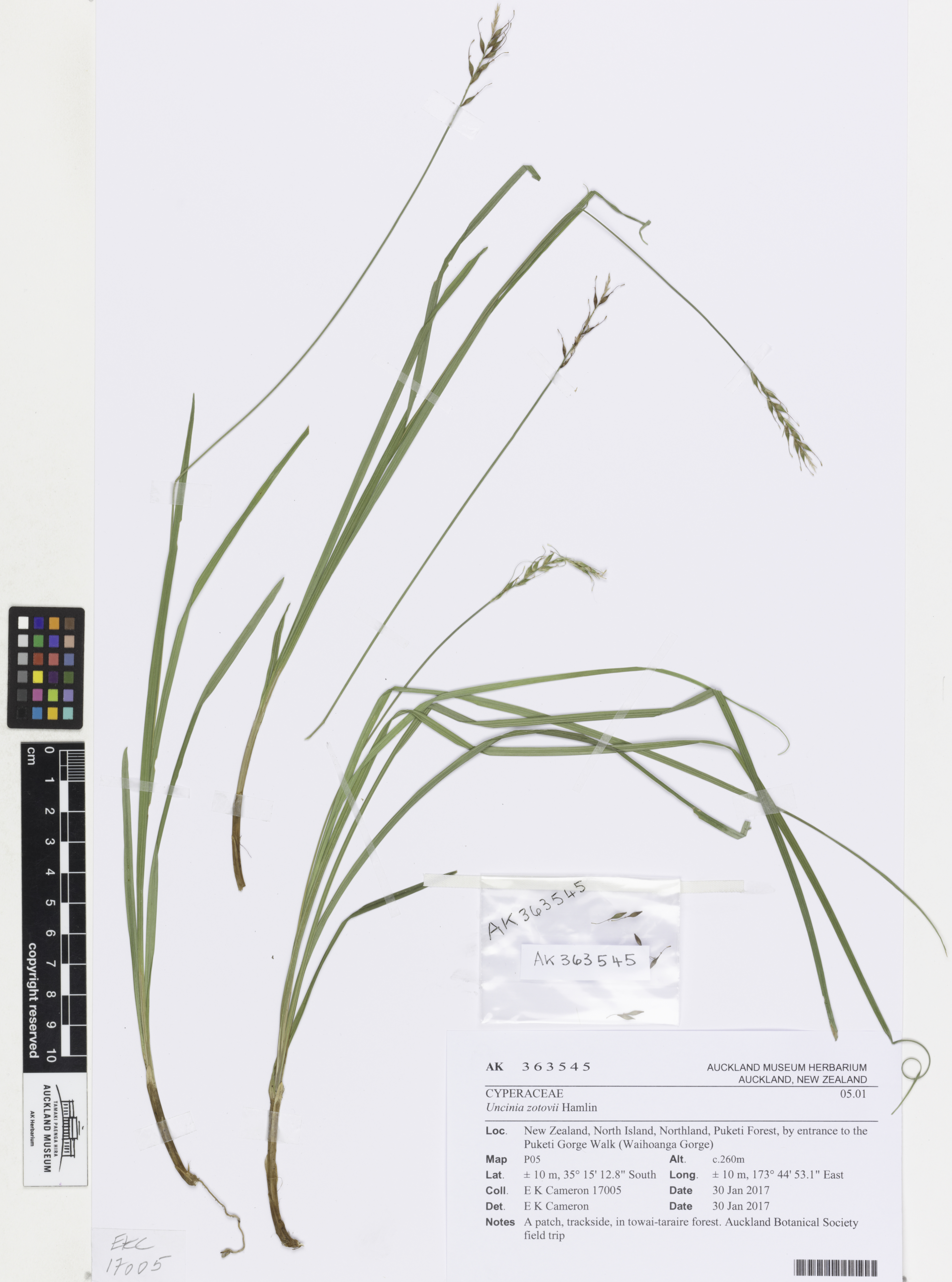

Scientific classification
- Kingdom: Plantae
- Clade: Tracheophytes
- Clade: Angiosperms
- Clade: Monocots
- Clade: Commelinids
- Order: Poales
- Family: Cyperaceae
- Genus: Carex
- Species: C. zotovii

Binomial name
- Carex zotovii (Hamelin) K.A.Ford

Synonyms
- Uncinia zotovii Hamlin

= Carex zotovii =

Species of grass-like plant

Carex zotovii is a perennial sedge of the Cyperaceae family that is native to the South Island and North Island of New Zealand.

== See also ==
- List of Carex species
