= Carex aucklandica =

Scientific classification
- Kingdom: Plantae
- Clade: Tracheophytes
- Clade: Angiosperms
- Clade: Monocots
- Clade: Commelinids
- Order: Poales
- Family: Cyperaceae
- Genus: Carex
- Species: C. aucklandica

Binomial name
- Carex aucklandica (Hamlin) K.A.Ford

Species of grass-like plant

Carex aucklandica, commonly known as Subantarctic hook grass, is a sedge that is found on the South Island of New Zealand, including Stewart Island.

== See also ==
- List of Carex species
