= U. elegans =

U. elegans may refer to:

- Udvardya elegans, a jumping spider species endemic to New Guinea
- Uncinia elegans, a flowering plant species found in New Zealand and Tasmania
- Urocitellus elegans, the Wyoming ground squirrel, a rodent species endemic to the United States
- Uta elegans, a side-blotched lizard
