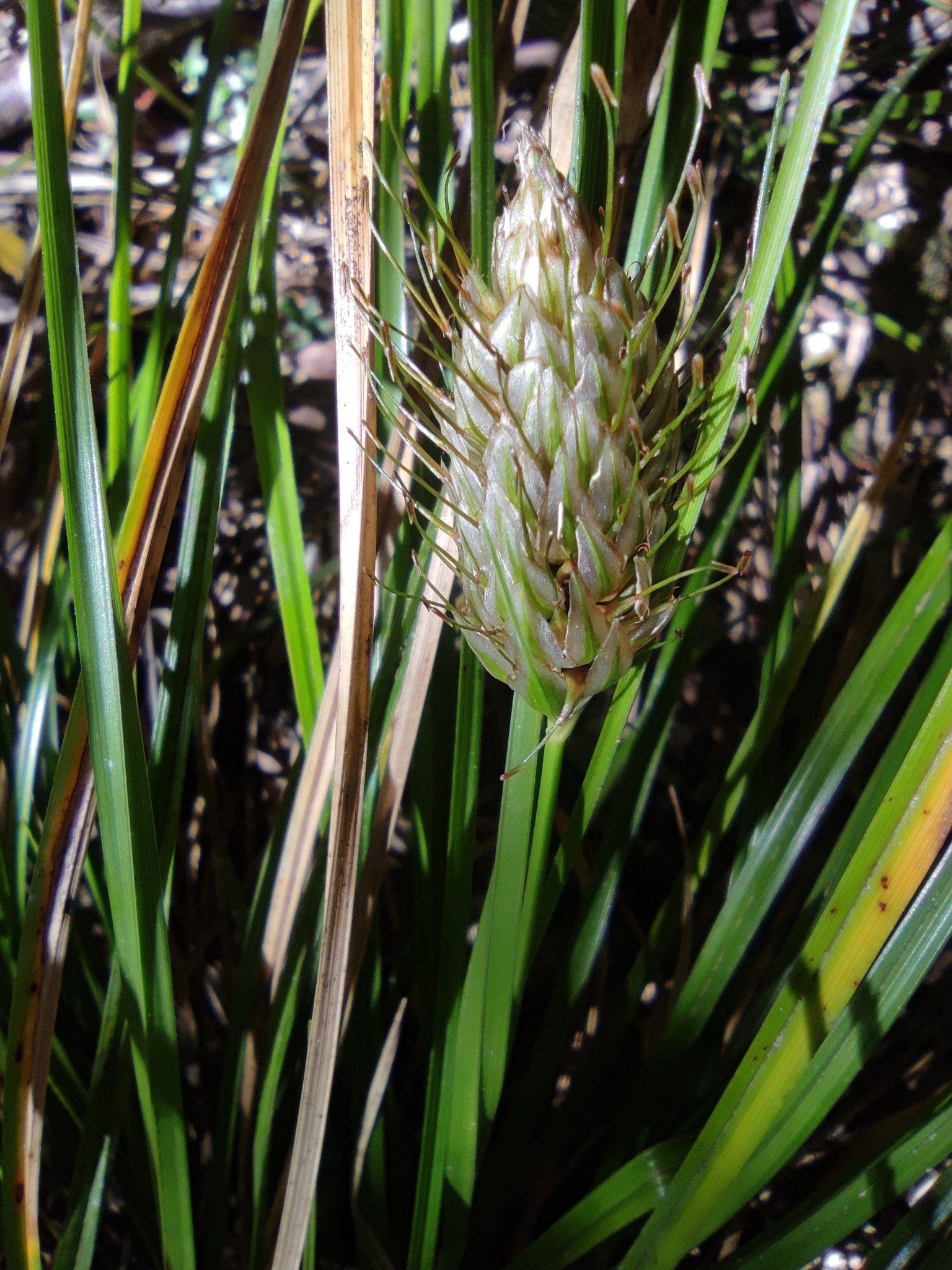

Scientific classification
- Kingdom: Plantae
- Clade: Tracheophytes
- Clade: Angiosperms
- Clade: Monocots
- Clade: Commelinids
- Order: Poales
- Family: Cyperaceae
- Genus: Carex
- Species: C. dolichophylla

Binomial name
- Carex dolichophylla J.R.Starr

= Carex dolichophylla =

Species of plant

Carex dolichophylla is a species of flowering plant in the family Cyperceae. It is a perennial herb endemic to southern Chile. It belongs to the Carex subg. Uncinia, one of the six currently recognized Carex subgenera, that corresponds to the now defunct genus Uncinia, formally transferred to Carex on 2015. The species was formerly known as Uncinia macrophylla Steud.

== Etymology ==
The epithet is a combination of the Greek words for long (dolichos) and leaves (phylla) attending to the long leaves that typically surpass the inflorescence of this large species.
