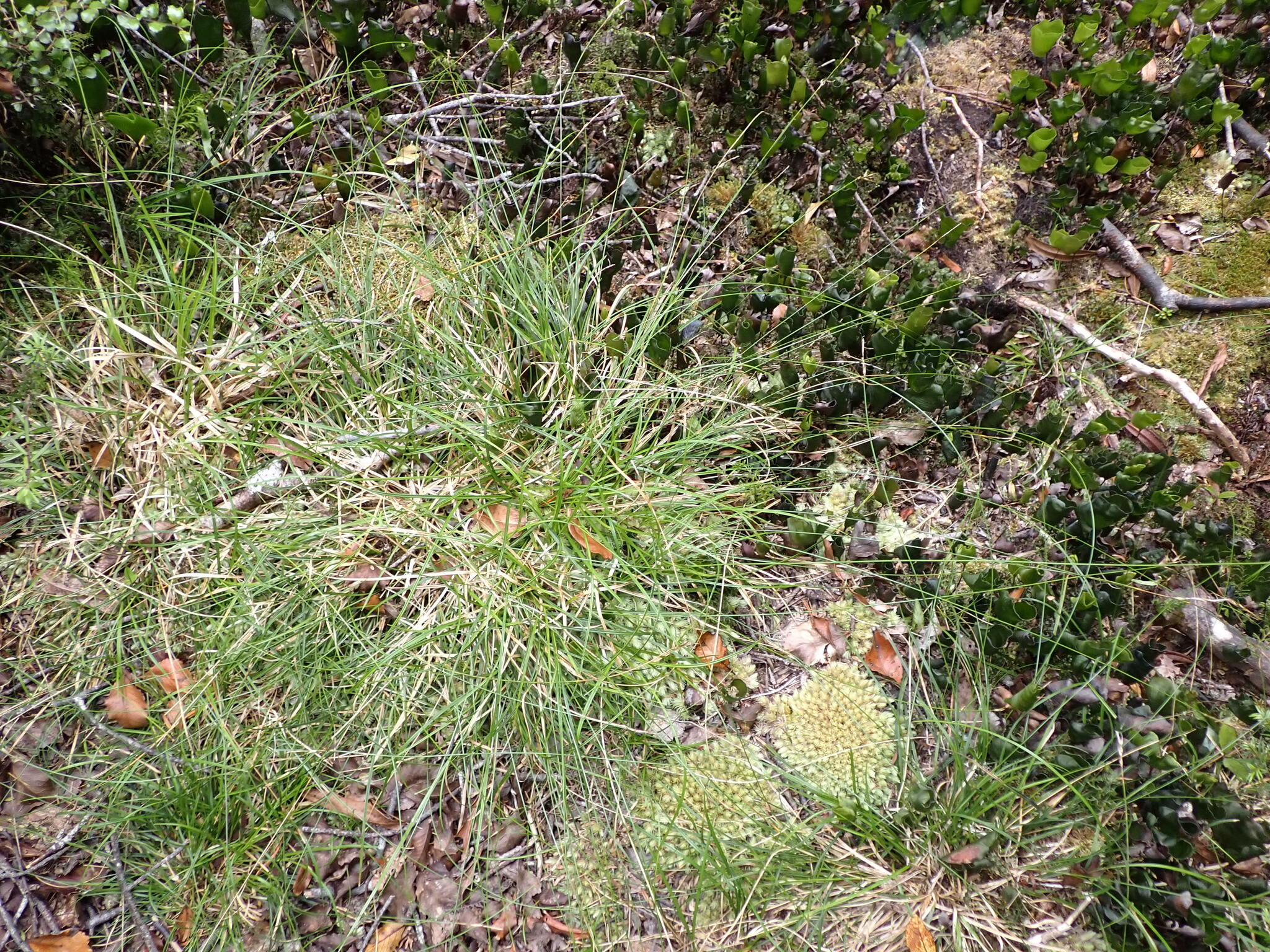
- C. horizontalis in Wellington

Conservation status
- Not Threatened (NZ TCS)

Scientific classification
- Kingdom: Plantae
- Clade: Tracheophytes
- Clade: Angiosperms
- Clade: Monocots
- Clade: Commelinids
- Order: Poales
- Family: Cyperaceae
- Genus: Carex
- Species: C. horizontalis

Binomial name
- Carex horizontalis (Colenso) K.A.Ford

= Carex horizontalis =

Species of sedge

Carex horizontalis, known as bastard grass, hook sedge, or matua in te reo Māori is a species of sedge, endemic to New Zealand. It is not a grass but a sedge.

== Description ==
This species forms thick, dense tufts. The culms are from 10–40 cm, droop, and are hairless. There are 4-7 leaves per culm, and they are bright green, wide, soft, and channeled.

C. horizontalis is distinguished from the very similar Carex minor by its dense, tufted growths, its slightly larger (1.5–2 mm wide) leaves, and its later flowering from October to November.

== Range and habitat ==
This species is found on the North Island, South Island, and in the Chatham Islands. It is found in forested areas, and at elevation from 300–1000 m above sea level in the North Island.

== Ecology ==
This species is one of many other species in Carex, which are collectively known for having hooked rachillae. This allows the spikelets to get caught on fur or feathers from animals, allowing them to hitch a ride on a moving creature in order to spread geographically.

== Etymology ==
The name "bastard grass" may come from the hooked rachillae, which are annoying and difficult to remove from clothing, hair, or skin.

== Taxonomy ==
This species has in the past been put into the genus Uncinia.
