= Carex edura =

Scientific classification
- Kingdom: Plantae
- Clade: Tracheophytes
- Clade: Angiosperms
- Clade: Monocots
- Clade: Commelinids
- Order: Poales
- Family: Cyperaceae
- Genus: Carex
- Species: C. edura

Binomial name
- Carex edura K.A.Ford

Species of grass-like plant

Carex edura is a perennial sedge of the Cyperaceae family that is native to Macquarie Island as well as the North Island and South Island and the Antipodean Islands of New Zealand.

== See also ==
- List of Carex species
