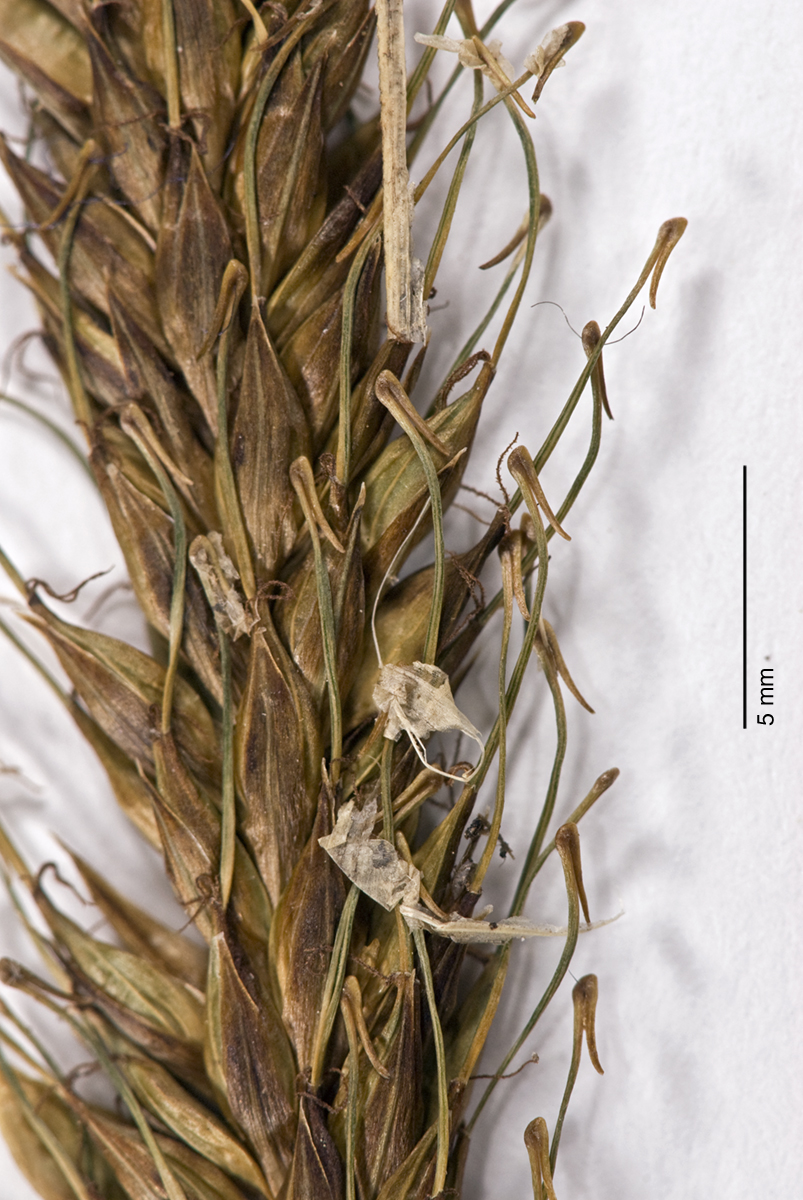
- Close up of herbarium specimen
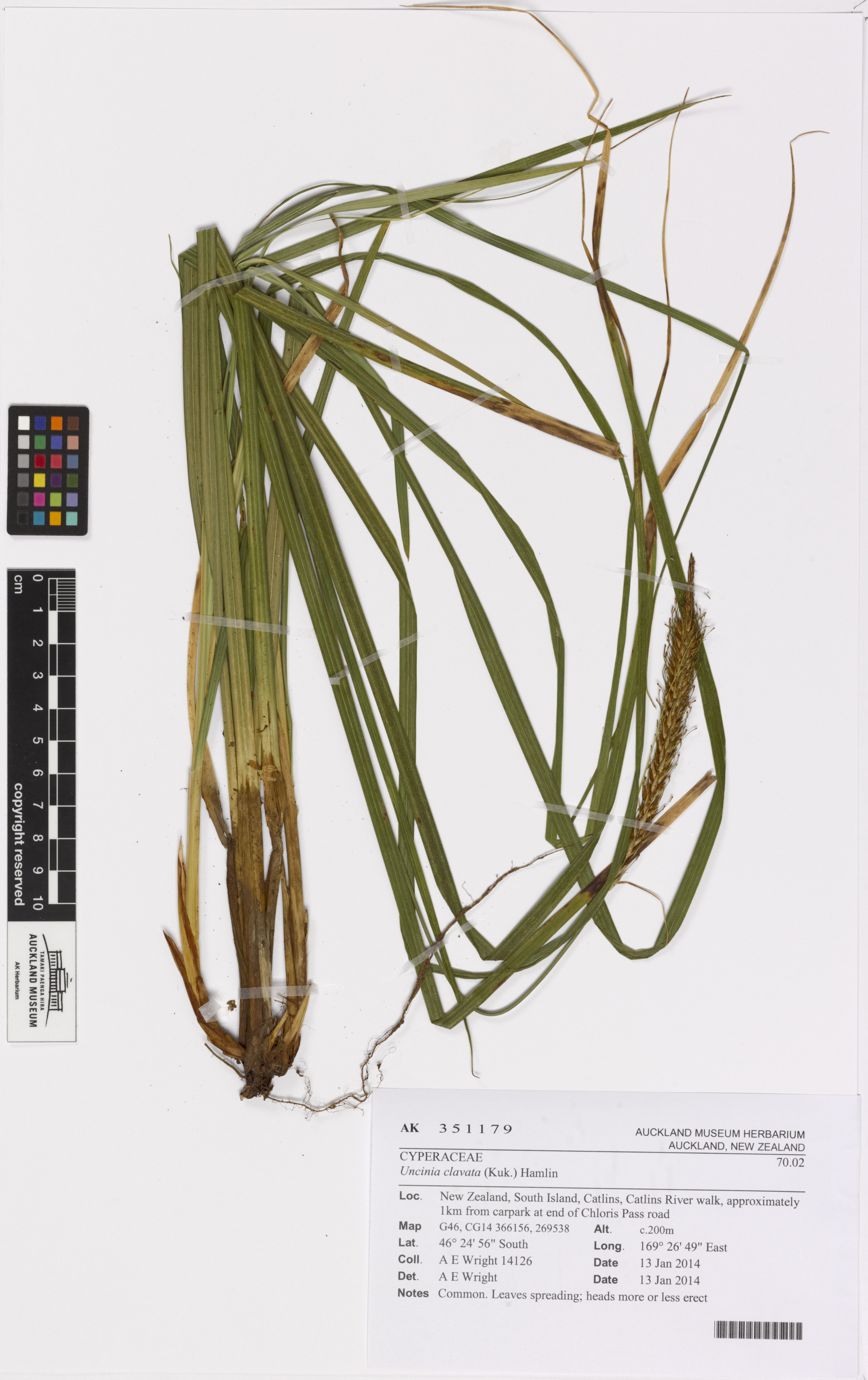
- Herbarium specimen

Scientific classification
- Kingdom: Plantae
- Clade: Tracheophytes
- Clade: Angiosperms
- Clade: Monocots
- Clade: Commelinids
- Order: Poales
- Family: Cyperaceae
- Genus: Carex
- Species: C. corynoidea

Binomial name
- Carex corynoidea K.A.Ford

Synonyms
- Uncinia australis var. clavata Kük.; Uncinia clavata (Kük.) Hamlin

= Carex corynoidea =

Species of plant

Carex corynoidea, fish hooks, is a species of flowering plant in the sedge family Cyperaceae, native to New Zealand. A perennial of montane forests, its chromosome number is 2n = 88.
