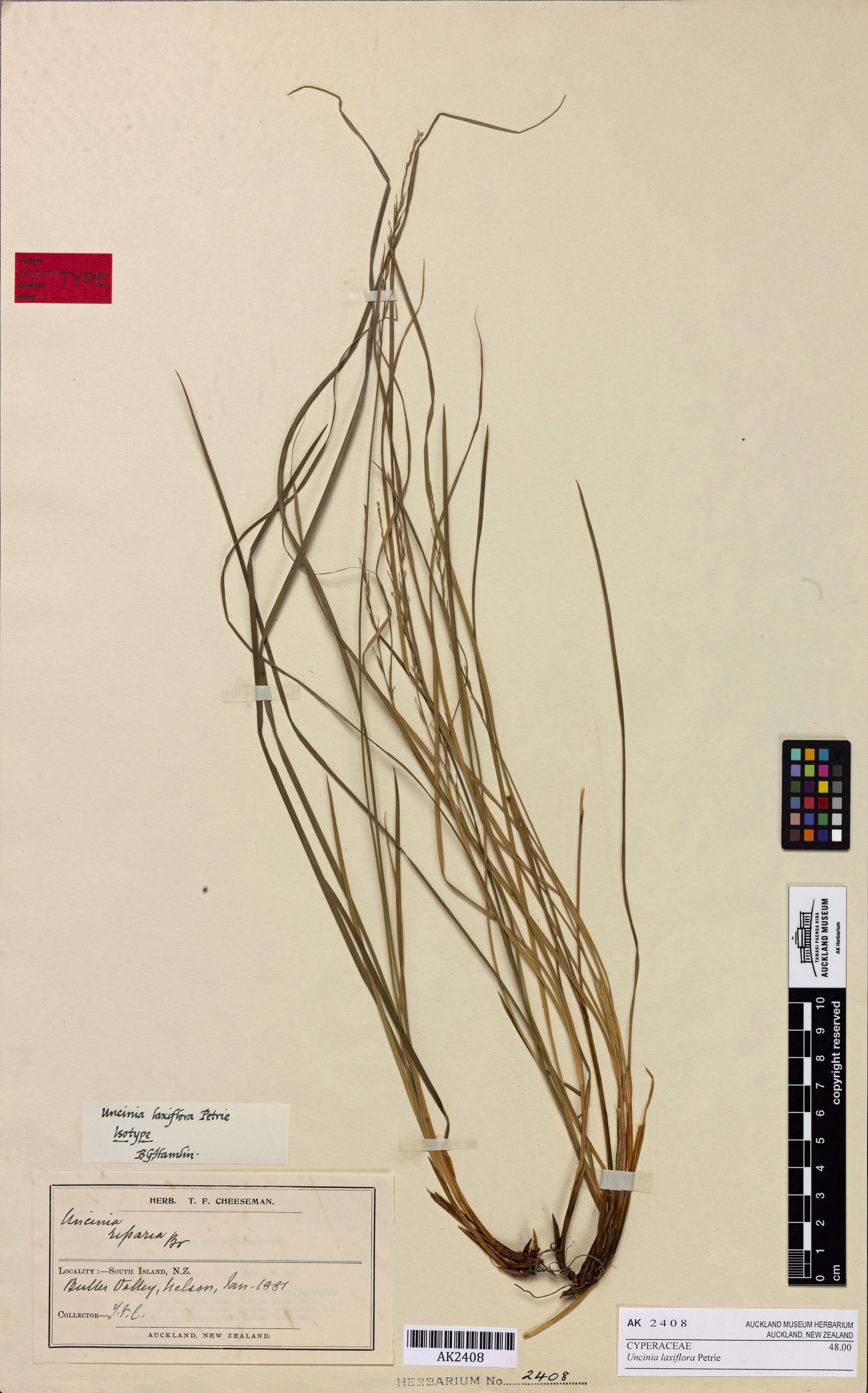

Scientific classification
- Kingdom: Plantae
- Clade: Tracheophytes
- Clade: Angiosperms
- Clade: Monocots
- Clade: Commelinids
- Order: Poales
- Family: Cyperaceae
- Genus: Carex
- Species: C. erythrovaginata

Binomial name
- Carex erythrovaginata K.A.Ford

Synonyms
- Uncinia laxiflora Petrie

= Carex erythrovaginata =

Species of plant

Carex erythrovaginata, the lax bastard grass, is a species of flowering plant in the family Cyperaceae, native to New Zealand. A stout tussock-former reaching 75 cm (30 in), its dark green leaves are strongly scabrid.
