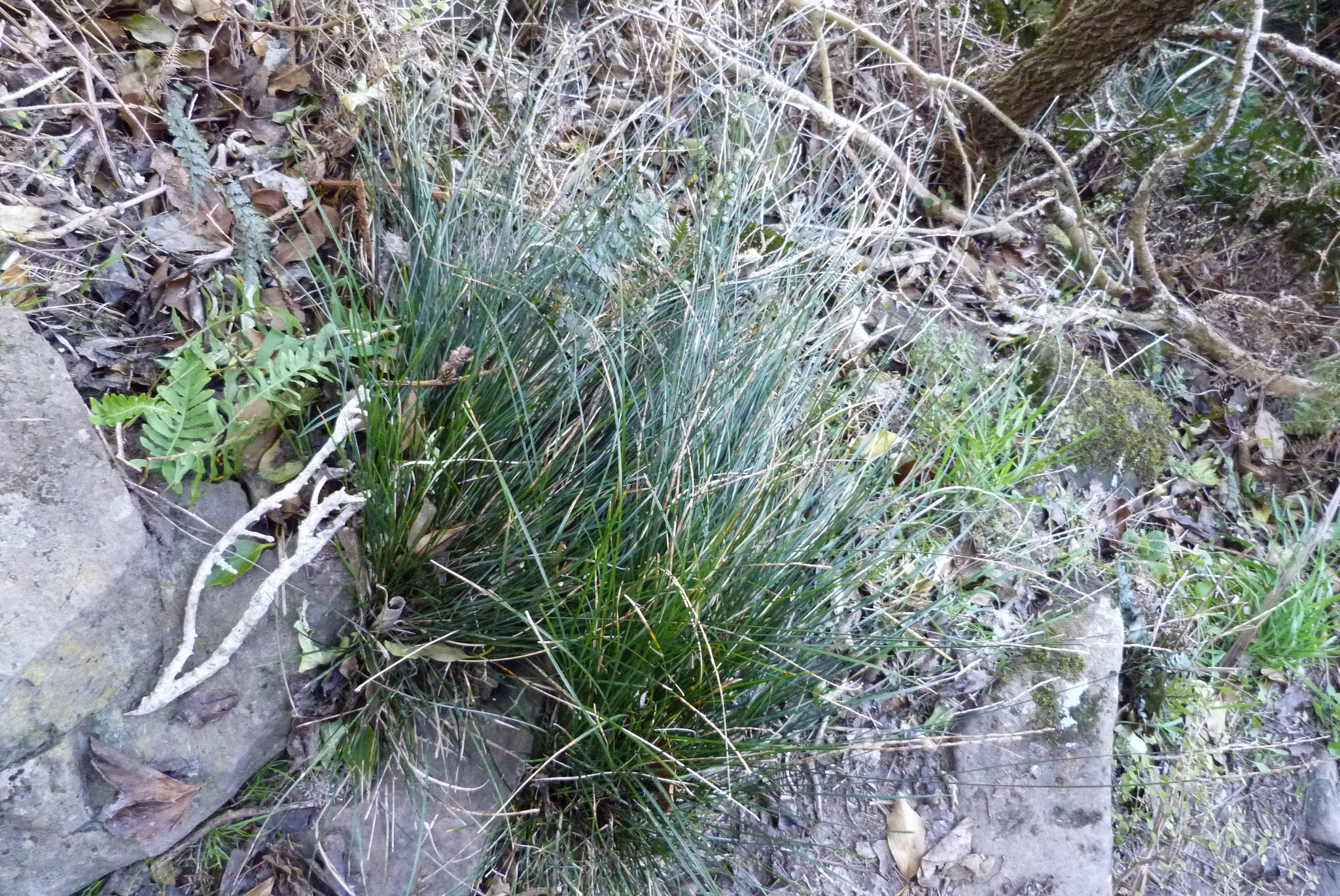
- Carex imbecilla found in the Port Hills near Christchurch

Scientific classification
- Kingdom: Plantae
- Clade: Tracheophytes
- Clade: Angiosperms
- Clade: Monocots
- Clade: Commelinids
- Order: Poales
- Family: Cyperaceae
- Genus: Carex
- Species: C. imbecilla

Binomial name
- Carex imbecilla K.A.Ford

Synonyms
- Uncinia gracilenta Hamlin

= Carex imbecilla =

Species of plant

Carex imbecilla, the feeble bastard grass, is a species of flowering plant in the sedge family Cyperaceae, endemic to New Zealand. It is often found growing on or near rotten logs.

In the North Island this sedge is found from 36 degrees latitude south. In the South Island its range includes Marlborough Sounds, northern Marlborough, Nelson, Otago, South Canterbury, Westland, Fiordland, and it is also present on Stewart Island/ Rākiura.

Its habitat is mainly montane forest and subalpine scrubland, but in the more southerly parts of its range it can be found down to the coast.

C. imbecilla flowers between October and December, with seeds ripening from November to April.

Although it is easily propagated from fresh seed, and by division of plants, it is not commercially available.

C. imbecilla is differentiated from most other carex species in having glossy, dark brown basal bracts. C. erebus, and C. aucklandica also have this characteristic, but can be distinguished by the length of their floral spikes.

.
