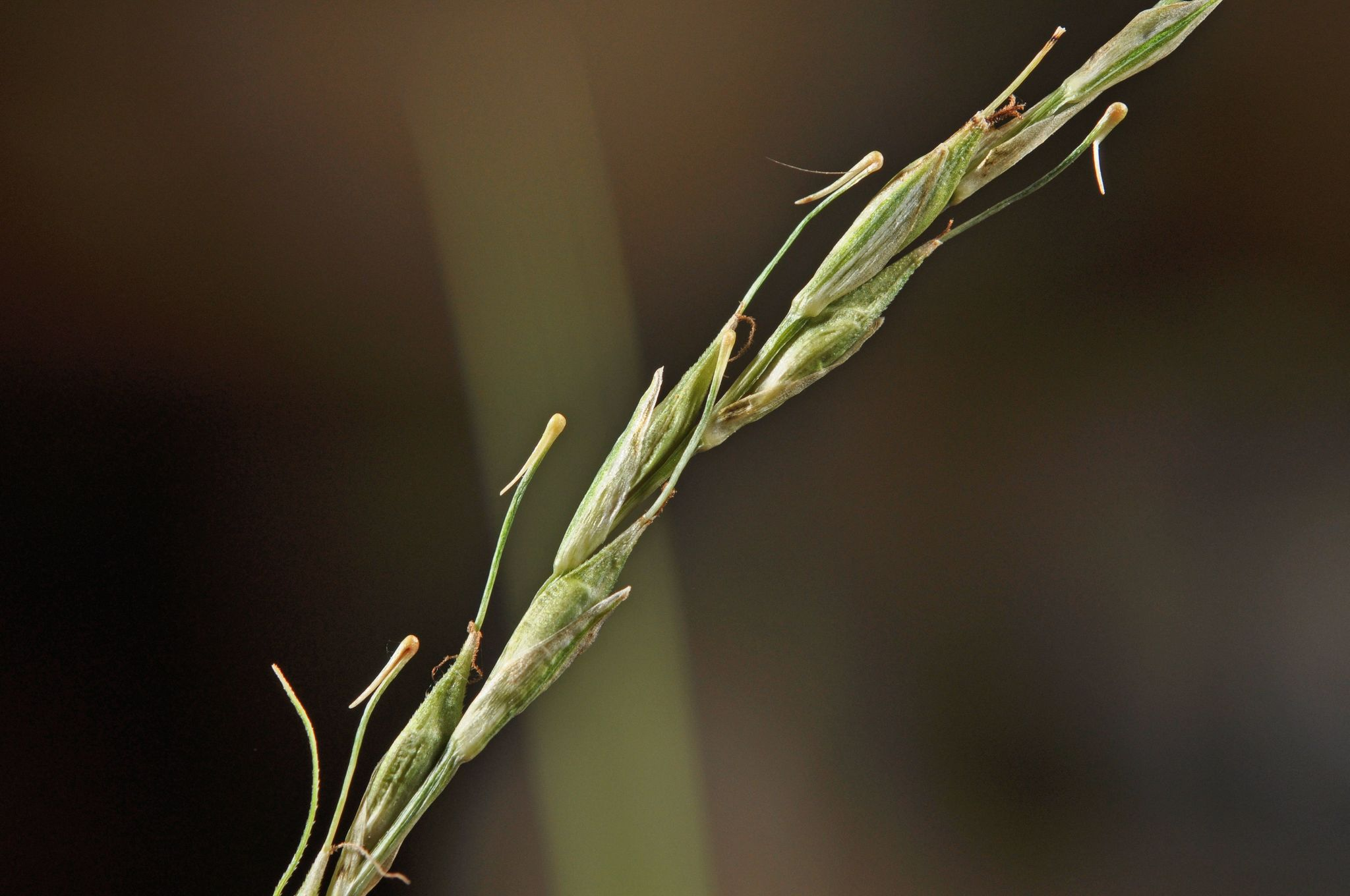
- Carex healyi seen near Cass, Canterbury Region

Scientific classification
- Kingdom: Plantae
- Clade: Tracheophytes
- Clade: Angiosperms
- Clade: Monocots
- Clade: Commelinids
- Order: Poales
- Family: Cyperaceae
- Genus: Carex
- Species: C. healyi

Binomial name
- Carex healyi K.A.Ford

Synonyms
- Uncinia disticha Colenso; Uncinia scabra Colenso ex Boott

= Carex healyi =

Species of plant

Carex healyi, the harsh-leaved bastard grass, is a species of flowering plant in the family Cyperaceae, native to New Zealand. Found in a wide variety of habitats but preferring semi-shade, its chromosome number is 2n = 88.
