= Carex goetghebeurii =

Conservation status
- Vulnerable (IUCN 3.1)

Scientific classification
- Kingdom: Plantae
- Clade: Tracheophytes
- Clade: Angiosperms
- Clade: Monocots
- Clade: Commelinids
- Order: Poales
- Family: Cyperaceae
- Genus: Carex
- Species: C. goetghebeurii

Binomial name
- Carex goetghebeurii J.R.Starr

Synonyms
- Uncinia tenuifolia G.A.Wheeler & Goetgh.

Species of grass-like plant

Carex goetghebeurii is a species of plant in the sedge family, Cyperaceae. It is endemic to Ecuador. Its natural habitat is subtropical or tropical dry shrubland.
