= Carex ecuadorensis =

Conservation status
- Vulnerable (IUCN 3.1)

Scientific classification
- Kingdom: Plantae
- Clade: Tracheophytes
- Clade: Angiosperms
- Clade: Monocots
- Clade: Commelinids
- Order: Poales
- Family: Cyperaceae
- Genus: Carex
- Species: C. ecuadorensis

Binomial name
- Carex ecuadorensis (G.A.Wheeler & Goetgh.) J.R.Starr

Synonyms
- Uncinia ecuadorensis G.A.Wheeler & Goetgh.

Species of grass-like plant

Carex ecuadorensis is a species of plant in the sedge family, Cyperaceae. It is endemic to Ecuador. Its natural habitat is subtropical or tropical high-altitude grassland.
