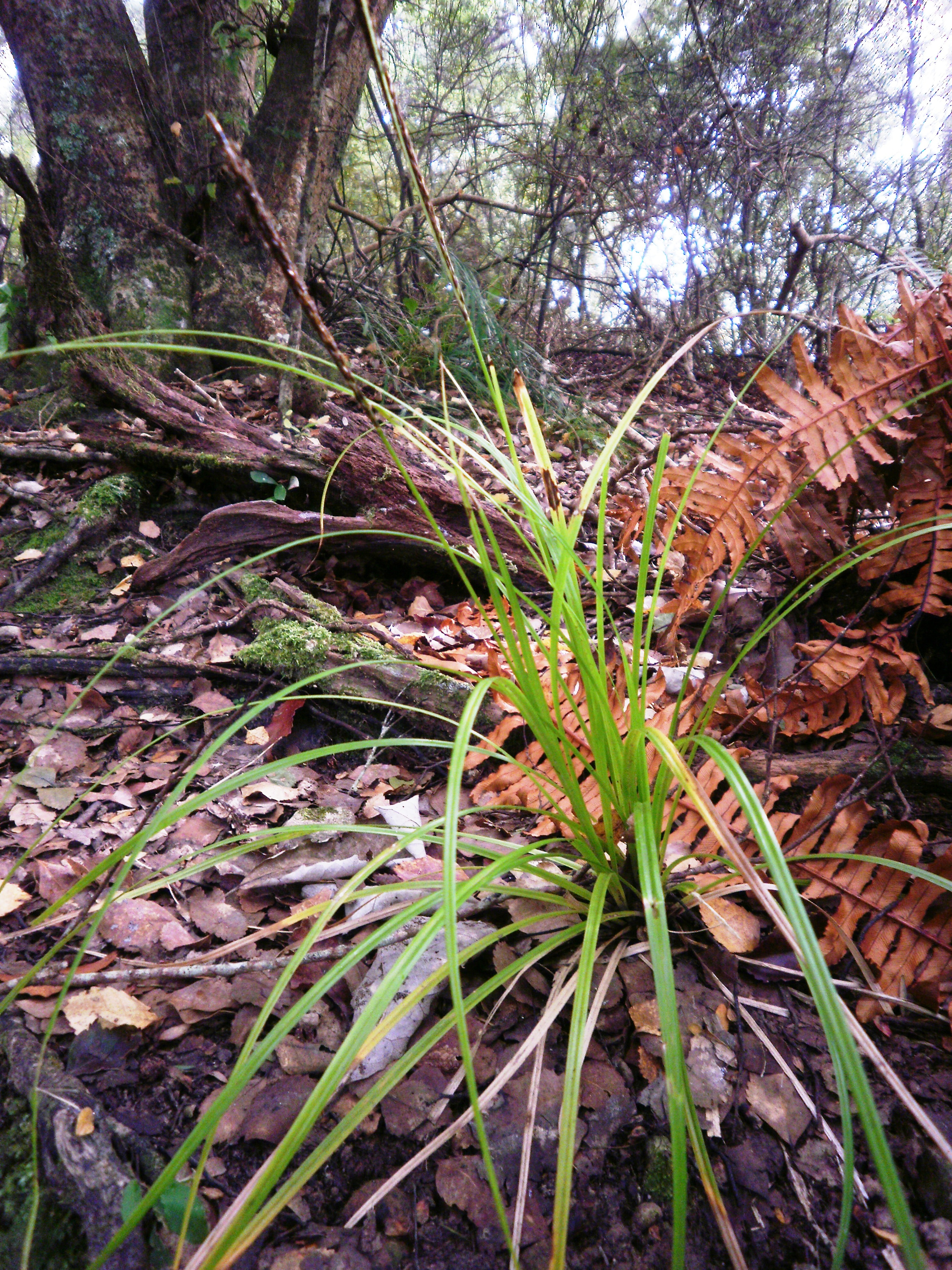

Scientific classification
- Kingdom: Plantae
- Clade: Embryophytes
- Clade: Tracheophytes
- Clade: Angiosperms
- Clade: Monocots
- Clade: Commelinids
- Order: Poales
- Family: Cyperaceae
- Genus: Carex
- Species: C. uncinata

Binomial name
- Carex uncinata L.f.

Synonyms
- List: Uncinia australis Pers.; Carex hamosa Thouars; Uncinia scaberrima Nees; Uncinia lindleyana Kunth; Uncinia rigidula Steud.; Uncinia alopecuroides Colenso; Uncinia bractata Colenso; Uncinia polyneura Colenso; Uncinia pedicellata Kük.; Uncinia uncinata (L.f.) Kük.

= Carex uncinata =

Species of grass-like plant

Carex uncinata, the Hawai'i birdcatching sedge, hook grass, hook sedge, bastard grass, kamu or matau-a-maui, is a species of flowering plant in the sedge family, Cyperaceae.

Carex uncinata is native to New Zealand (including the Antipodes), the Society Islands, and Hawaii. Its natural habitat is from the coast up to 1,000 m (3,300 ft), where it is found in areas ranging from native forest to shrubland.
