= Carex madida =

Conservation status
- Endangered (IUCN 3.1)

Scientific classification
- Kingdom: Plantae
- Clade: Tracheophytes
- Clade: Angiosperms
- Clade: Monocots
- Clade: Commelinids
- Order: Poales
- Family: Cyperaceae
- Genus: Carex
- Species: C. madida

Binomial name
- Carex madida J.R.Starr

Synonyms
- Uncinia lacustris G.A.Wheeler

Species of grass-like plant

Carex madida is a species of plant in the family Cyperaceae. It is endemic to Ecuador. Its natural habitat is subtropical or tropical high-altitude grassland.
