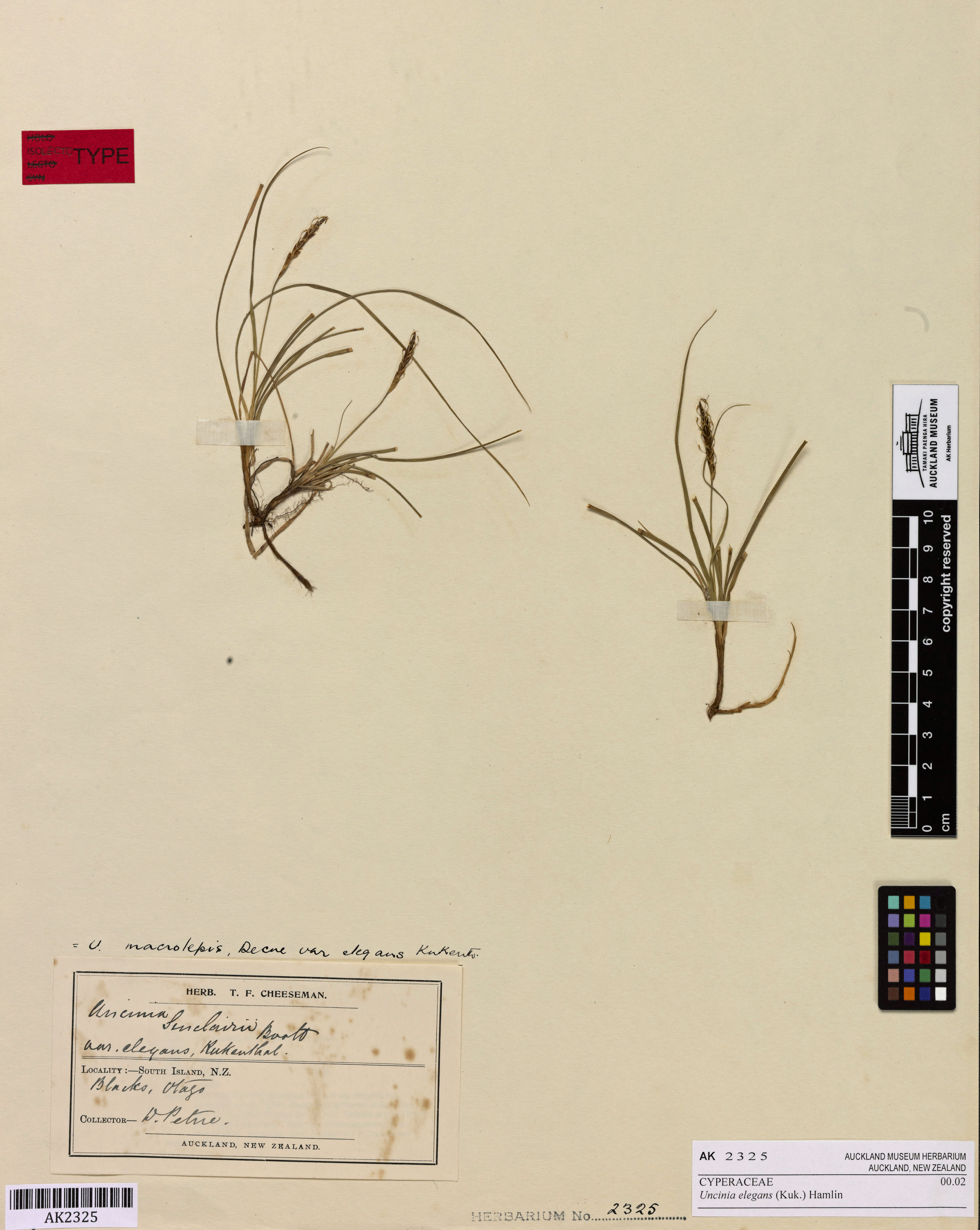
- Herbarium specimen

Scientific classification
- Kingdom: Plantae
- Clade: Tracheophytes
- Clade: Angiosperms
- Clade: Monocots
- Clade: Commelinids
- Order: Poales
- Family: Cyperaceae
- Genus: Carex
- Species: C. subtilis

Binomial name
- Carex subtilis K.A.Ford

Synonyms
- Uncinia sinclairii var. elegans Kük.; Uncinia elegans (Kük.) Hamlin

= Carex subtilis =

Species of grass-like plant

Carex subtilis is a species of flowering plants in the family Cyperaceae. It is found in New Zealand and Tasmania.
