= Kerry Ford =

New Zealand botanist (born 1964)

Kerry Alison Ford (born 1964) is a botanist from New Zealand. She is best known for her contributions to the study of New Zealand Flora and is interested in the biosystematics and taxonomy of species in the Cyperaceae and Poaceae families.
