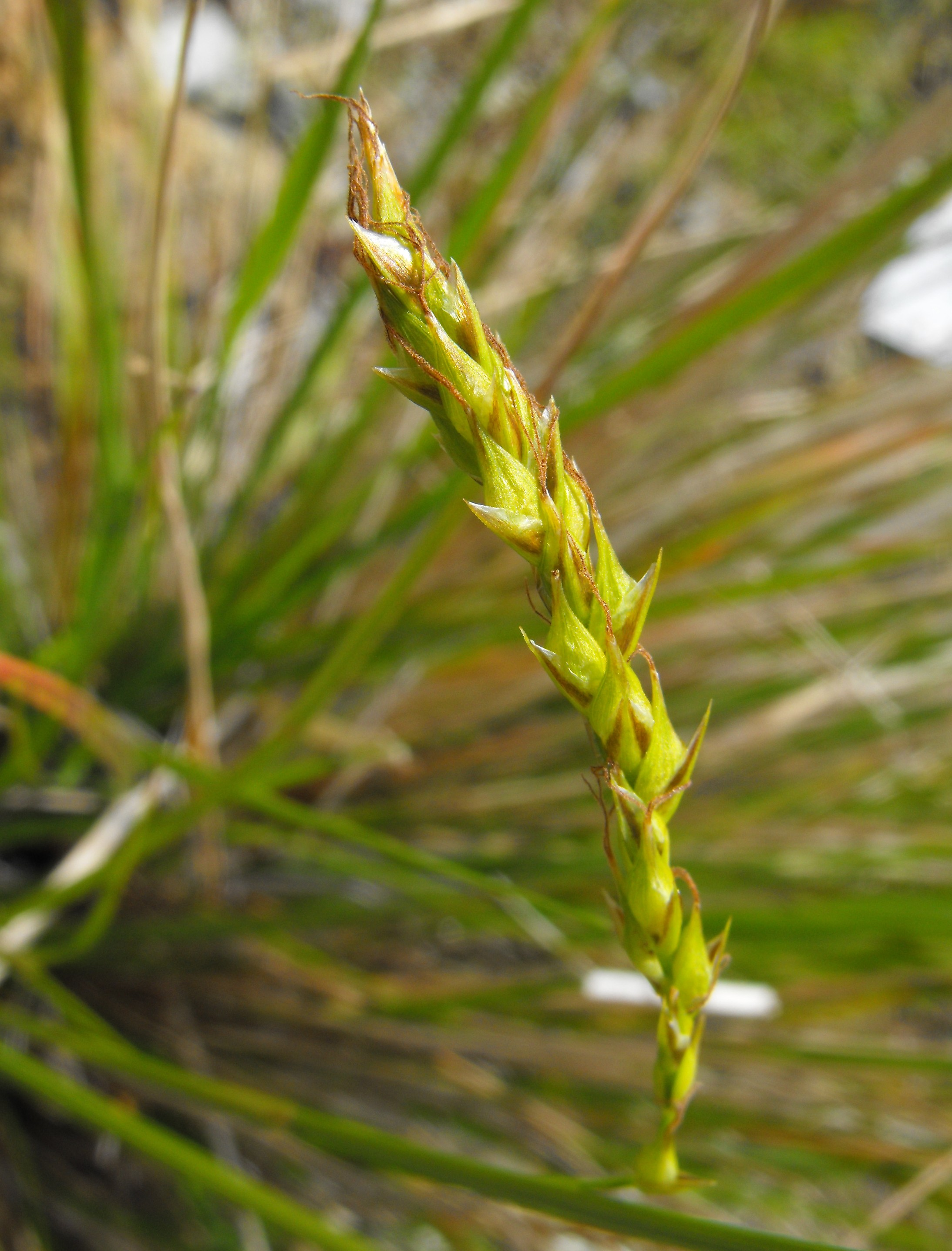
- Inflorescence
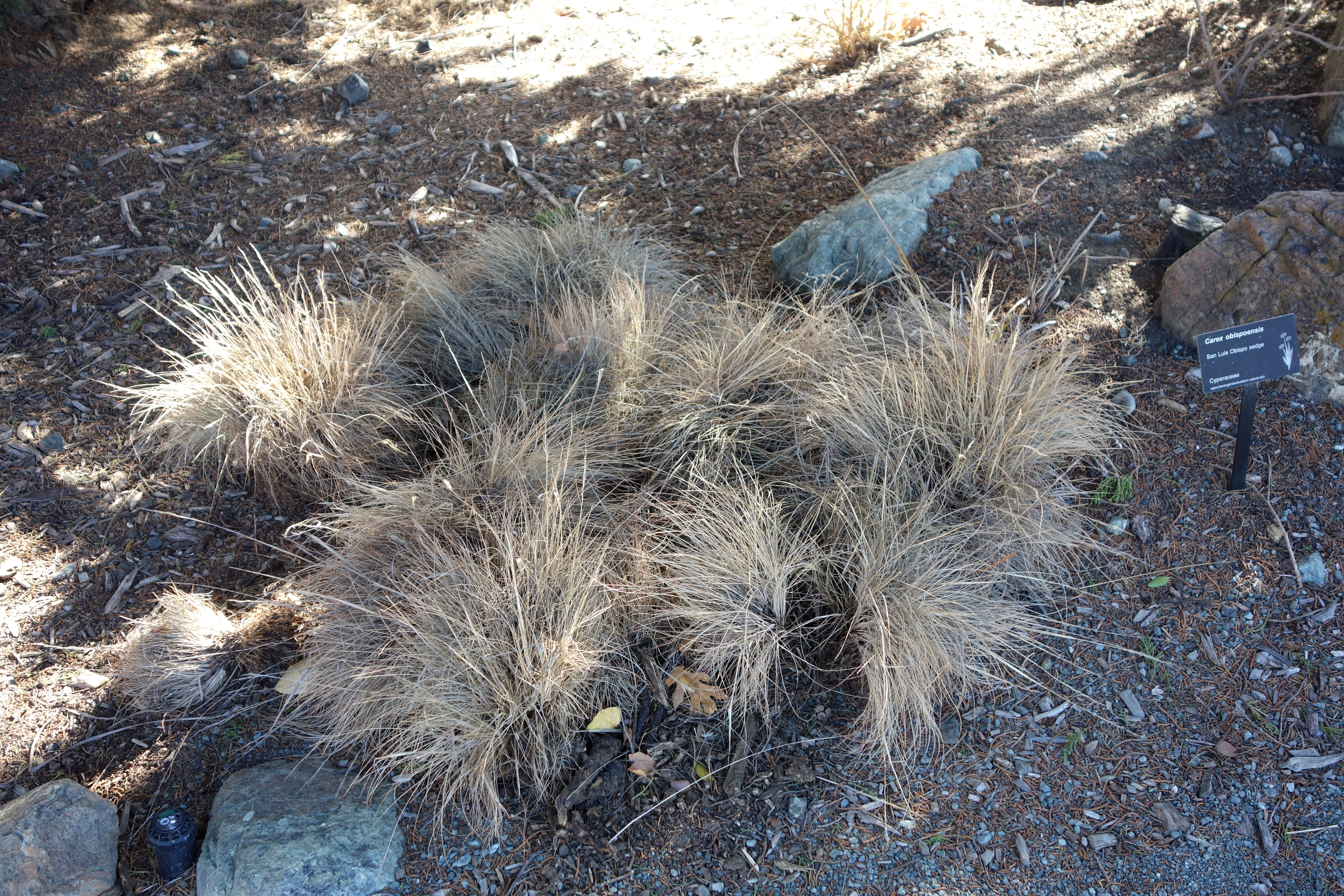
- At the Leaning Pine Arboretum

Scientific classification
- Kingdom: Plantae
- Clade: Tracheophytes
- Clade: Angiosperms
- Clade: Monocots
- Clade: Commelinids
- Order: Poales
- Family: Cyperaceae
- Genus: Carex
- Species: C. obispoensis

Binomial name
- Carex obispoensis Stacey

= Carex obispoensis =

Species of flowering plant

Carex obispoensis, the San Luis Obispo sedge, is a species of flowering plant in the family Cyperaceae, native to San Luis Obispo County, California. It is a specialist on serpentine soil.
