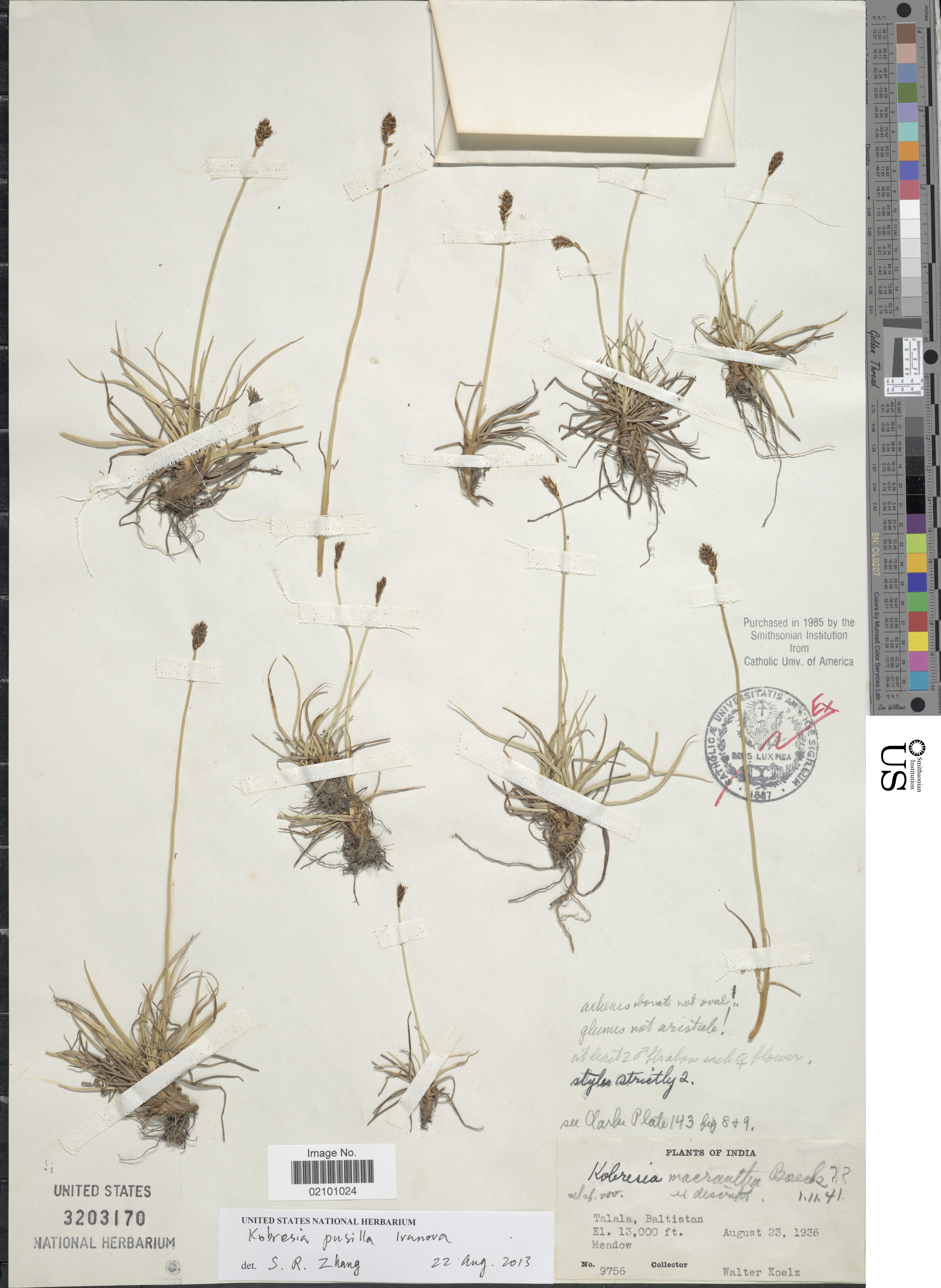

Scientific classification
- Kingdom: Plantae
- Clade: Embryophytes
- Clade: Tracheophytes
- Clade: Spermatophytes
- Clade: Angiosperms
- Clade: Monocots
- Clade: Commelinids
- Order: Poales
- Family: Cyperaceae
- Genus: Carex
- Species: C. coninux

Binomial name
- Carex coninux (F.T.Wang & Tang) S.R.Zhang

Synonyms
- Kobresia coninux F.T.Wang & Tang 1951; Kobresia daqingshanica X.Y.Mao 1988; Kobresia helanshanica W.Z.Di & M.J.Zhong 1985; Kobresia karakorumensis Dickoré 1995; Kobresia pusilla N.A.Ivanova 1939

= Carex coninux =

Species of sedge

Carex coninux is a tussock-forming perennial in the family Cyperaceae. It is endemic to parts of central and eastern Asia from Afghanistan in the south west through to northern parts of China and Mongolia in the north east.

== Description ==
The sedge has a short woody rhizome topped by dull brown coloured basal sheaths. The erect and densely tufted culms have a triangular cross section and are typically 2 to 15 cm (0.79 to 5.91 in) in length and 0.7 to 1 mm (0.028 to 0.039 in) in diameter. The leaves are usually have the same to slightly shorter length compared to the culms. The flat bladed leaves have a width of 1 to 2 mm (0.039 to 0.079 in) and possess a distinct mid-rib and are folded into a v-shape near the base. The brown coloured inflorescence is densely packed with smaller spikes and has an overall narrowly elliptic to oblong shape. The plant flowers between May and October.

== Classification ==
The species was first described by the Russian botanist Nina Alexandrovna Ivanova in 1939 in the journal Botanicheskii Zhurnal SSSR as Kobresia pusilla. In 1951 it was reclassified as Kobresia coninux and transferred to the genus Carex in 2015.

The species has one homotypic synonym:

- Kobresia coninux F.T.Wang & Tang 1951

and four heterotypic synonyms:

- Kobresia daqingshanica X.Y.Mao 1988
- Kobresia helanshanica W.Z.Di & M.J.Zhong 1985
- Kobresia karakorumensis Dickoré 1995
- Kobresia pusilla N.A.Ivanova 1939

== Distribution ==
The plant is found is temperate biomes from Afghanistan and Pakistan in the south-west and Tajikistan in the north-east stretching eastward through the western Himalaya and Tibet and into Mongolia and northern and central parts of China including the provinces of Qinghai and Xinjiang.

== See also ==
- List of Carex species
