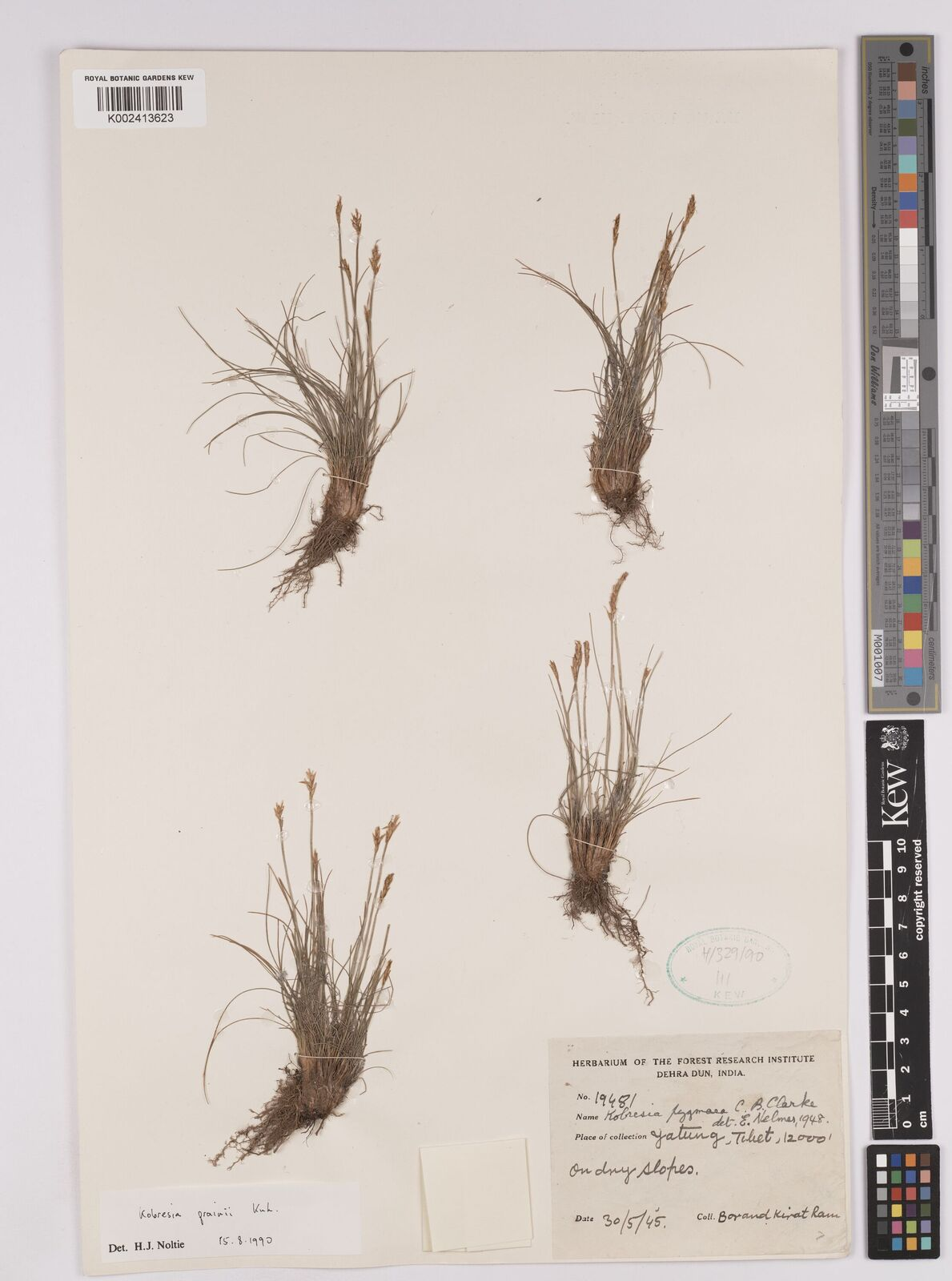

Scientific classification
- Kingdom: Plantae
- Clade: Embryophytes
- Clade: Tracheophytes
- Clade: Angiosperms
- Clade: Monocots
- Clade: Commelinids
- Order: Poales
- Family: Cyperaceae
- Genus: Carex
- Species: C. bhutanensis

Binomial name
- Carex bhutanensis S.R.Zhang

Synonyms
- Kobresia prainii Kük.; Kobresia prainii var. elliptica Y.C.Yang; Kobresia utriculata C.B.Clarke

= Carex bhutanensis =

Species of sedge

Carex bhutanensis is a tussock-forming perennial in the family Cyperaceae. It is endemic to eastern parts of the Himalaya including Nepal and Tibet.

== See also ==
- List of Carex species
