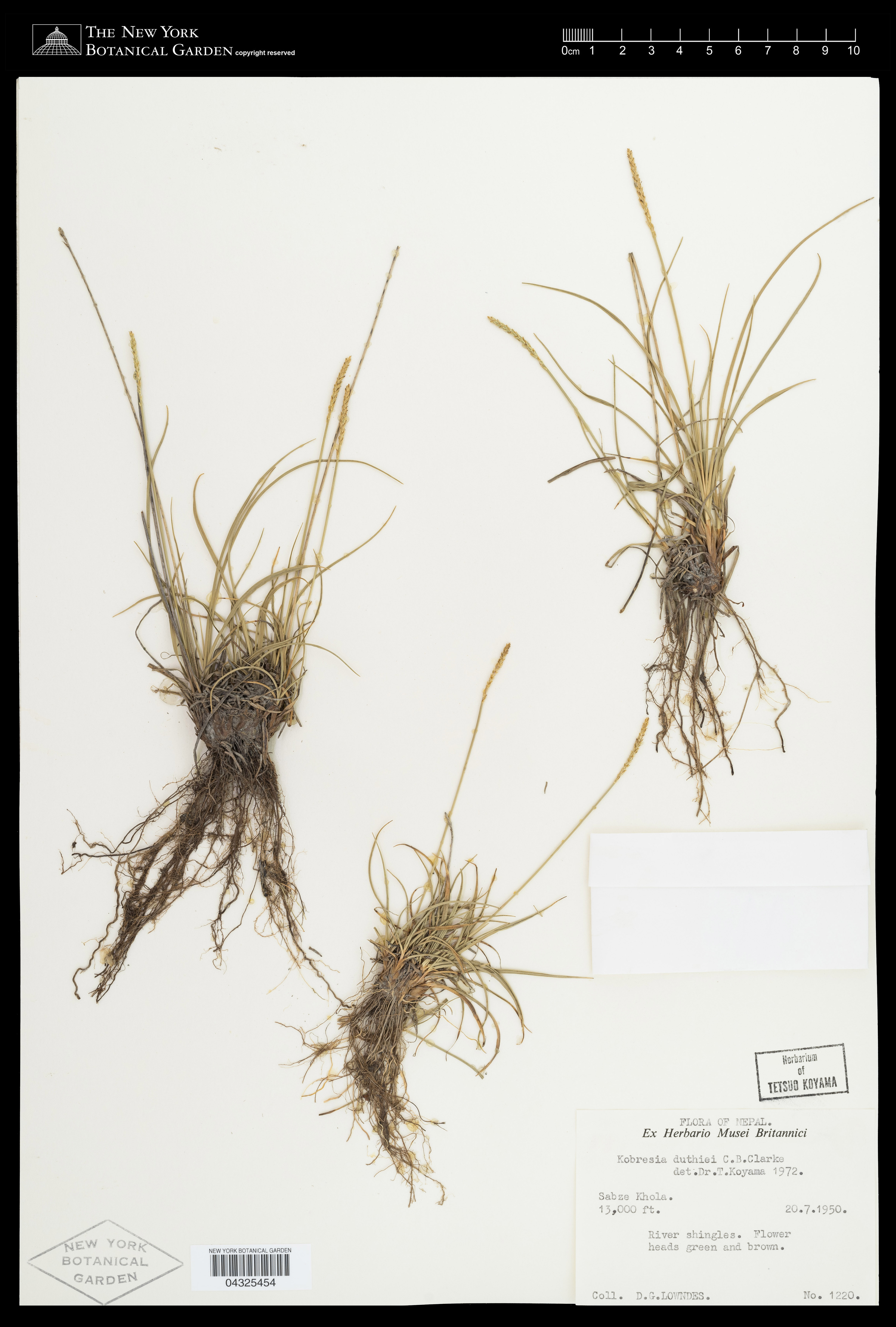

Scientific classification
- Kingdom: Plantae
- Clade: Embryophytes
- Clade: Tracheophytes
- Clade: Angiosperms
- Clade: Monocots
- Clade: Commelinids
- Order: Poales
- Family: Cyperaceae
- Genus: Carex
- Species: C. clavispica

Binomial name
- Carex clavispica S.R.Zhang

Synonyms
- Kobresia duthiei C.B.Clarke

= Carex clavispica =

Species of sedge

Carex clavispica is a tussock-forming perennial in the family Cyperaceae. It is endemic to the Himalayas, Tibet, Nepal and south-central parts of China.

== See also ==
- List of Carex species
