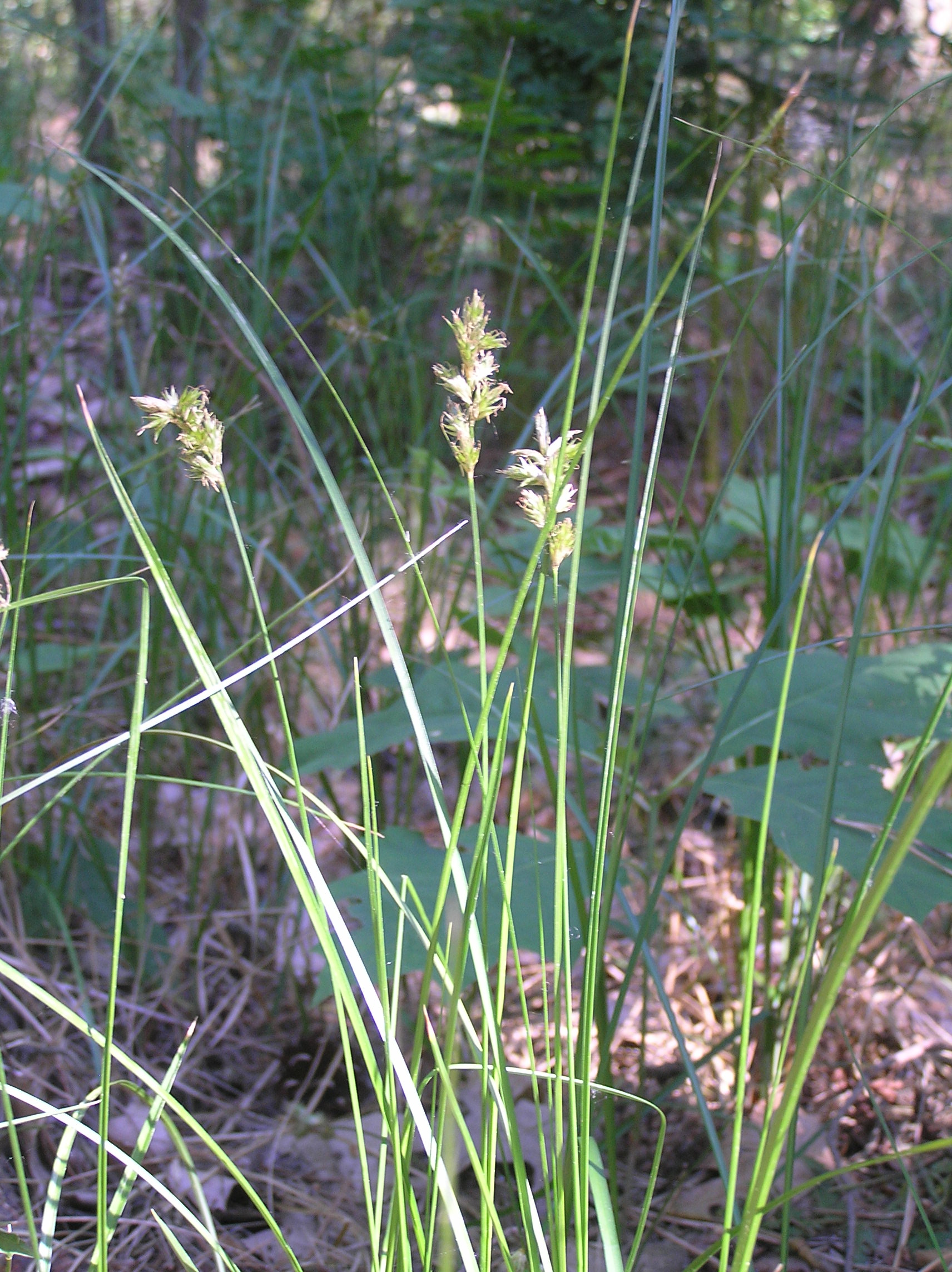

Scientific classification
- Kingdom: Plantae
- Clade: Tracheophytes
- Clade: Angiosperms
- Clade: Monocots
- Clade: Commelinids
- Order: Poales
- Family: Cyperaceae
- Genus: Carex
- Species: C. pseudobrizoides

Binomial name
- Carex pseudobrizoides Clavaud

= Carex pseudobrizoides =

Species of grass-like plant

Carex pseudobrizoides is a species of flowering plant belonging to the family Cyperaceae.

Its native range is Western Europe to Latvia.
