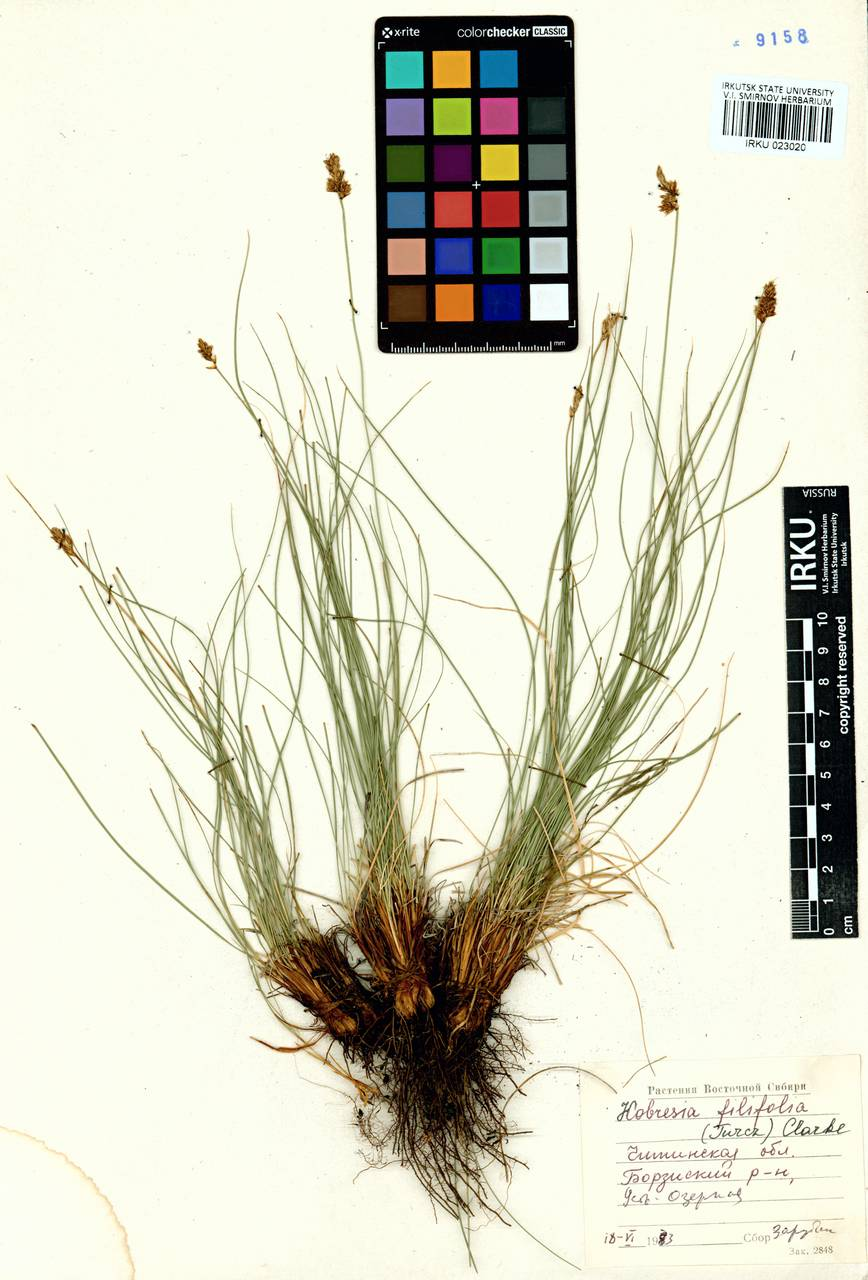

Scientific classification
- Kingdom: Plantae
- Clade: Embryophytes
- Clade: Tracheophytes
- Clade: Spermatophytes
- Clade: Angiosperms
- Clade: Monocots
- Clade: Commelinids
- Order: Poales
- Family: Cyperaceae
- Genus: Carex
- Species: C. macroprophylla

Binomial name
- Carex macroprophylla (Y.C.Yang) S.R.Zhang

Synonyms
- Kobresia filifolia var. macroprophylla Y.C.Yang (1984); Kobresia macroprophylla (Y.C.Yang) P.C.Li (2000)

= Carex macroprophylla =

Species of sedge

Carex macroprophylla is a tussock-forming perennial in the family Cyperaceae. It is endemic to northern parts of China, Inner Mongolia and eastern parts of Russia .

== See also ==
- List of Carex species
