= Carex libera =

Scientific classification
- Kingdom: Plantae
- Clade: Embryophytes
- Clade: Tracheophytes
- Clade: Angiosperms
- Clade: Monocots
- Clade: Commelinids
- Order: Poales
- Family: Cyperaceae
- Genus: Carex
- Species: C. libera

Binomial name
- Carex libera Hamlin

Species of grass-like plant

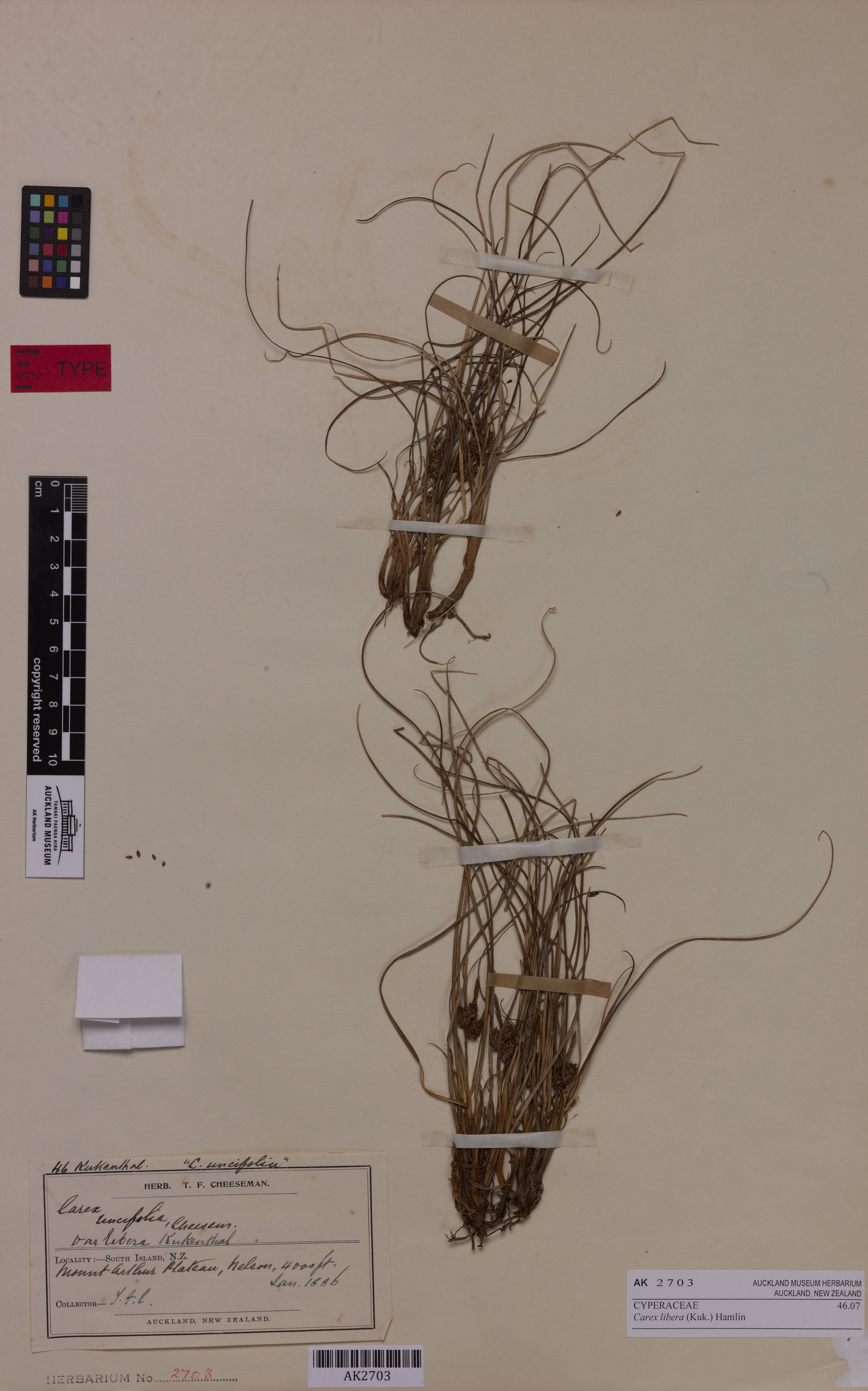
Carex libera

Carex libera is a sedge that is found in the South Island of New Zealand.

== See also ==
- List of Carex species
