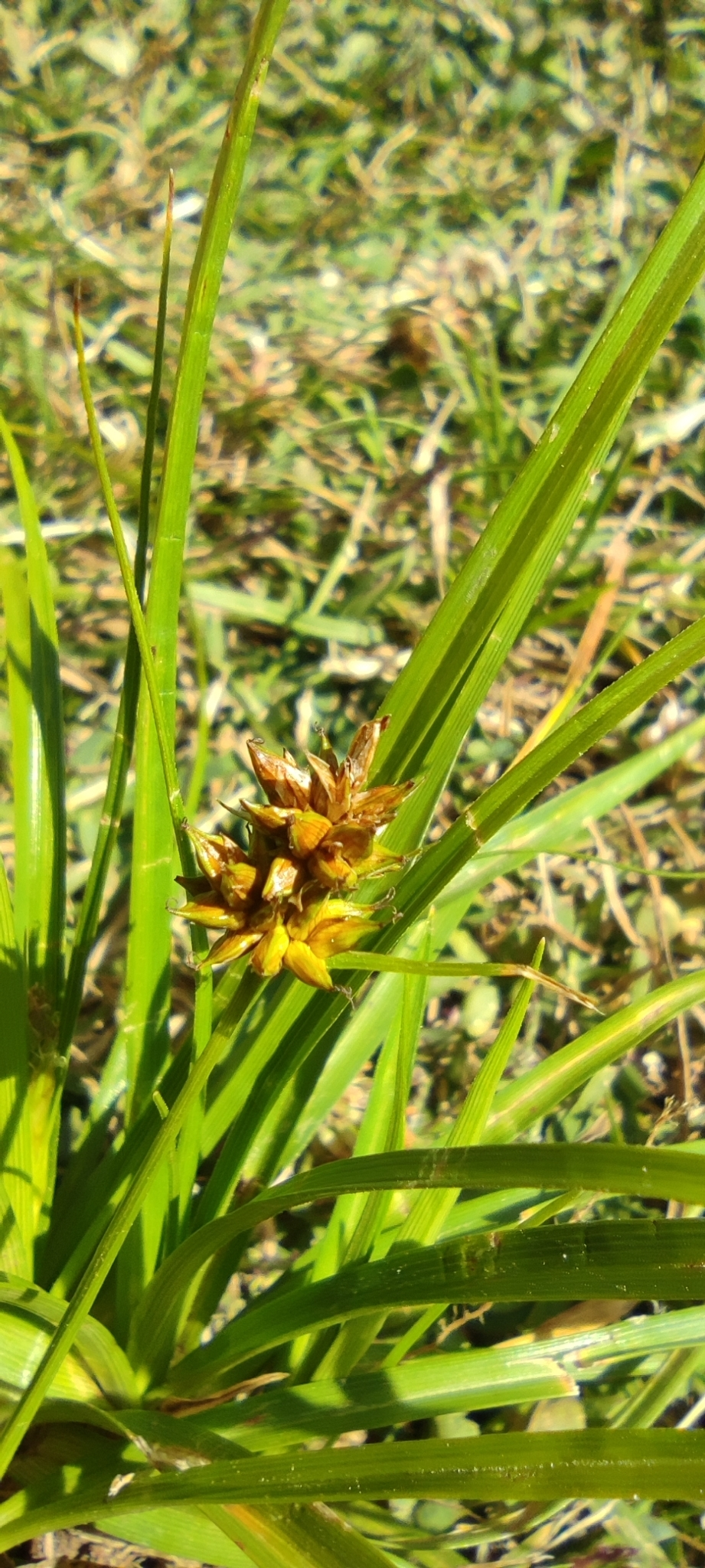

Scientific classification
- Kingdom: Plantae
- Clade: Tracheophytes
- Clade: Angiosperms
- Clade: Monocots
- Clade: Commelinids
- Order: Poales
- Family: Cyperaceae
- Genus: Carex
- Species: C. bracteosa

Binomial name
- Carex bracteosa (Rchb.) Kunze ex Kunth

= Carex bracteosa =

Species of plant

Carex bracteosa is a species of flowering plant in the family Cyperaceae. It is endemic to Chile, inhabiting the central and southern regions.
