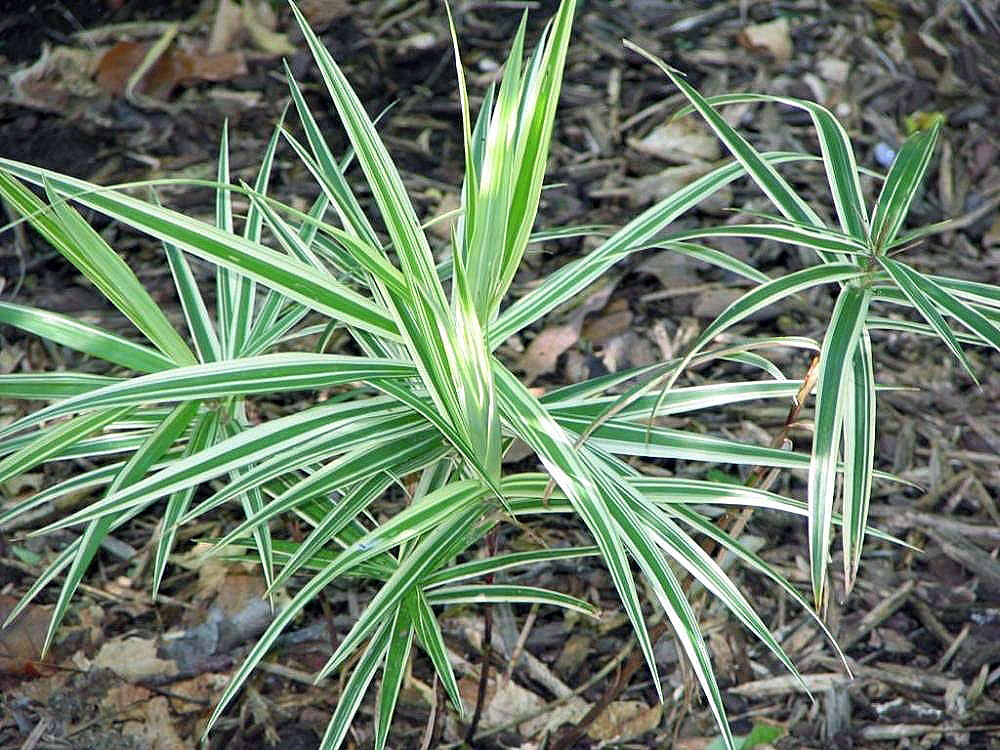
- Carex phyllocephala 'Sparkler' cultivar

Scientific classification
- Kingdom: Plantae
- Clade: Tracheophytes
- Clade: Angiosperms
- Clade: Monocots
- Clade: Commelinids
- Order: Poales
- Family: Cyperaceae
- Genus: Carex
- Species: C. phyllocephala

Binomial name
- Carex phyllocephala T.Koyama

= Carex phyllocephala =

Species of flowering plant

Carex phyllocephala is a species of flowering plant in the sedge genus Carex, family Cyperaceae. It is native to southern China, and introduced to Japan. A variegated cultivar, 'Sparkler', is commercially available.
