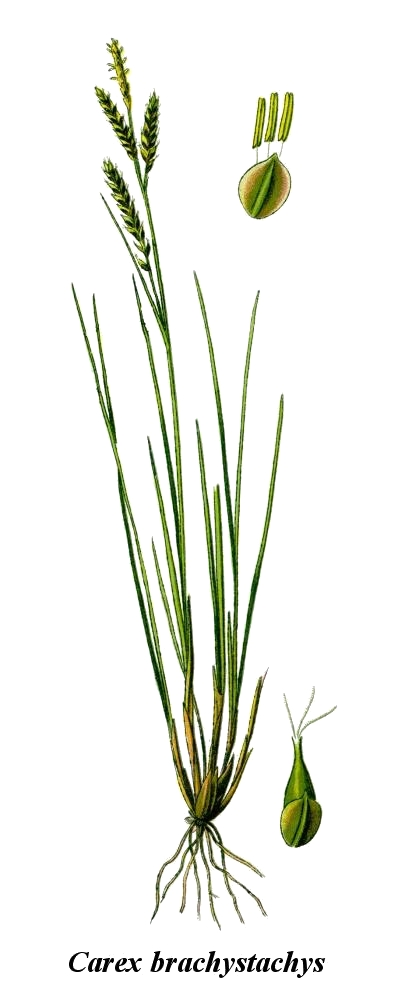
- Botanical illustration

Scientific classification
- Kingdom: Plantae
- Clade: Tracheophytes
- Clade: Angiosperms
- Clade: Monocots
- Clade: Commelinids
- Order: Poales
- Family: Cyperaceae
- Genus: Carex
- Species: C. brachystachys

Binomial name
- Carex brachystachys Schrank

Synonyms
- Carex compressa Kit. ex Willd.; Carex mielichhoferi Willd. ex Kunth; Carex strigosa All.; Carex tenuis Host; Carex valesiaca Suter

= Carex brachystachys =

Species of grass-like plant

Carex brachystachys is a species of sedge found in the mountains of central and southern Europe.
