= Carex fossa =

Scientific classification
- Kingdom: Plantae
- Clade: Embryophytes
- Clade: Tracheophytes
- Clade: Spermatophytes
- Clade: Angiosperms
- Clade: Monocots
- Clade: Commelinids
- Order: Poales
- Family: Cyperaceae
- Genus: Carex
- Species: C. fossa

Binomial name
- Carex fossa G.A.Wheeler

Species of plant

Carex fossa is a tussock-forming species of perennial sedge in the family Cyperaceae. It is native to parts of South America south of Brazil.

== Description ==
The plant typically has 3 to 7 leaves per stalk. The leaf blades vary 0.8–3.4 mm wide. The inflorescences of the plant are 0.8–1.8 cm long and 0.6–1.2 mm wide.

== Taxonomy and distribution ==
Carex fossa was first proposed by Gerald A. Wheeler in 2002, and was named due to its common occurrence in roadside ditches and railroad embankments in Argentina. It is also commonly found in the pasture lands and grassy fields of South America. Specimens have been reported from Argentina, Uruguay and Paraguay.

== See also ==
- List of Carex species
