= Carex peregrina =

Scientific classification
- Kingdom: Plantae
- Clade: Tracheophytes
- Clade: Angiosperms
- Clade: Monocots
- Clade: Commelinids
- Order: Poales
- Family: Cyperaceae
- Genus: Carex
- Species: C. peregrina

Binomial name
- Carex peregrina Link

Synonyms
- Carex guthnickiana J.Gay; Carex macrostylos var. guthnickiana (J.Gay) C.B.Clarke, T.A.Durand & H.Schinz; Carex macrostylos var. peregrina (Link) L.H.Bailey ex Trel.; Carex sagittifera Lowe

Species of flowering plant

Carex peregrina is a species of sedge (family Cyperaceae), with a remarkably disjunct distribution; it is found in the Azores and Madeira islands in the eastern Atlantic, and more than 6,000 km (3,700 mi) away in the mountains of Ethiopia, Kenya, Uganda and Tanzania, in east Africa. It prefers to grow in montane forests but occasionally is found sunny grasslands from 2,300 to 3,500 m (7,500 to 11,500 ft) above sea level.
