= Carex kuchunensis =

Scientific classification
- Kingdom: Plantae
- Clade: Embryophytes
- Clade: Tracheophytes
- Clade: Spermatophytes
- Clade: Angiosperms
- Clade: Monocots
- Clade: Commelinids
- Order: Poales
- Family: Cyperaceae
- Genus: Carex
- Species: C. kuchunensis

Binomial name
- Carex kuchunensis Tang & F.T.Wang ex S.Y.Liang

Species of sedge

Carex kuchunensis is a tussock-forming perennial in the family Cyperaceae. It is endemic to south eastern parts of China in the provinces of Hunan, Guangxi and Guangdong.

The sedge has a short and woody rhizome. It forms culms that are typically 50 to 76 cm (20 to 30 in) in length. The wide, flat, leathery and broadly linear shaped leaves are usually a little longer than the culms. When it flowers it forms four to five flower spikes followed by purple to black coloured nutlets.

== See also ==
- List of Carex species
