= Carex handel-mazzettii =

Scientific classification
- Kingdom: Plantae
- Clade: Tracheophytes
- Clade: Angiosperms
- Clade: Monocots
- Clade: Commelinids
- Order: Poales
- Family: Cyperaceae
- Genus: Carex
- Species: C. handel-mazzettii

Binomial name
- Carex handel-mazzettii (N.A.Ivanov) S.R.Zhang

Synonyms
- Kobresia handel-mazzettii N.A.Ivanova; Kobresia capillifolia var. condensata Kük; Kobresia condensata (Kük.) S.R.Zhang & Noltie; Kobresia royleana var. himalaica Rajbh. & H.Ohba

Species of sedge

Carex handel-mazzettii is a tussock-forming perennial in the family Cyperaceae. It is endemic to parts of Nepal and central China including the provinces of Yunnan and Sichuan.

== See also ==
- List of Carex species
