= Carex ulobasis =

Scientific classification
- Kingdom: Plantae
- Clade: Tracheophytes
- Clade: Angiosperms
- Clade: Monocots
- Clade: Commelinids
- Order: Poales
- Family: Cyperaceae
- Genus: Carex
- Species: C. ulobasis

Binomial name
- Carex ulobasis V.I.Krecz.

Species of plant

Carex ulobasis, also known as montane sedge, is a tussock-forming species of perennial sedge in the family Cyperaceae. It is native to parts of eastern Russia in the north to Korea in the south.

The sedge has a short and woody rhizome with densely tufted red-brown coloured culms that are 15 to 25 cm (5.9 to 9.8 in) in height. The culms are triangular in cross section with a smooth lower portion but with a rougher texture toward the ends. The culms are sheathed at the base but the sheaths will crumble into fibres over time.

== See also ==
- List of Carex species
