= Carex goligongshanensis =

Scientific classification
- Kingdom: Plantae
- Clade: Tracheophytes
- Clade: Angiosperms
- Clade: Monocots
- Clade: Commelinids
- Order: Poales
- Family: Cyperaceae
- Genus: Carex
- Species: C. goligongshanensis

Binomial name
- Carex goligongshanensis P.C.Li

Species of sedge

Carex goligongshanensis is a tussock-forming perennial in the family Cyperaceae. It is endemic to south western parts of Sichuan province in south-central China.

The sedge has a short rhizome. The slender, tufted culms have a triangular cross-section and typically grow to a height of 40 to 60 cm (16 to 24 in). The base of the culms is surrounded by brown sheaths. The leaves have a flat linear blade and are about the same length as the culms and a width of 3 to 5 mm (0.12 to 0.20 in).

== See also ==
- List of Carex species
