= Carex baiposhanensis =

Scientific classification
- Kingdom: Plantae
- Clade: Tracheophytes
- Clade: Angiosperms
- Clade: Monocots
- Clade: Commelinids
- Order: Poales
- Family: Cyperaceae
- Genus: Carex
- Species: C. baiposhanensis

Binomial name
- Carex baiposhanensis P.C.Li

Species of sedge

Carex baiposhanensis is a tussock-forming perennial in the family Cyperaceae. It is endemic to the Sichuan province in south-central China.

C. baiposhanensis has a woody rhizome and a creeping horizontal stem. It has slender, tufted culms that typically grow to a height of 40 to 50 cm (16 to 20 in) and are surrounded at the base by reddish to brownish coloured sheaths.

== See also ==
- List of Carex species
