= Carex lindleyana =

Conservation status
- Least Concern (IUCN 3.1)

Scientific classification
- Kingdom: Plantae
- Clade: Tracheophytes
- Clade: Angiosperms
- Clade: Monocots
- Clade: Commelinids
- Order: Poales
- Family: Cyperaceae
- Genus: Carex
- Species: C. lindleyana

Binomial name
- Carex lindleyana Nees

Species of sedge

Carex lindleyana is a tussock-forming species of perennial sedge in the family Cyperaceae. It is native to parts of India, Sri Lanka and Vietnam.

It was described by the botanist Christian Gottfried Daniel Nees von Esenbeck in 1834 as published in Contributions to the Botany of India. It has one synonym; Carex thyrsiflora.

== See also ==
- List of Carex species
