= Carex monodynama =

Scientific classification
- Kingdom: Plantae
- Clade: Tracheophytes
- Clade: Angiosperms
- Clade: Monocots
- Clade: Commelinids
- Order: Poales
- Family: Cyperaceae
- Genus: Carex
- Species: C. monodynama

Binomial name
- Carex monodynama (Griseb.) G.A.Wheeler

Synonyms
- Carex atropicta var. monodynama Griseb.; Carex atropicta var. pallescens Kurtz ex Kük.; Carex atropicta f. pallescens (Kurtz ex Kük.) Kük.

Species of plant

Carex monodynama is a species of flowering plant in the family Cyperaceae. It is a tussock-forming species of perennial sedge that is native to parts of Argentina.

== See also ==
- List of Carex species
