= Carex zunyiensis =

Scientific classification
- Kingdom: Plantae
- Clade: Tracheophytes
- Clade: Angiosperms
- Clade: Monocots
- Clade: Commelinids
- Order: Poales
- Family: Cyperaceae
- Genus: Carex
- Species: C. zunyiensis

Binomial name
- Carex zunyiensis Tang & F.T.Wang

Species of grass-like plant

Carex zunyiensis is a plant species of the genus Carex and the family Cyperaceae.

== Description ==
It is described as having short woody rhizomes. with very short leaves that are about 25 to 70 centimeters long. Found in Southern China.

== Taxonomy ==
It was described by Tsin Tang & Fa Tsuan Wang. In: Acta Phytotax. Sin. 24: 241. in 1986.
