= Carex appendiculata =

Scientific classification
- Kingdom: Plantae
- Clade: Tracheophytes
- Clade: Angiosperms
- Clade: Monocots
- Clade: Commelinids
- Order: Poales
- Family: Cyperaceae
- Genus: Carex
- Species: C. appendiculata

Binomial name
- Carex appendiculata (Trautv. & C.A.Mey.) Kük.

Synonyms
- Carex gaudichaudiana subsp. appendiculata (Trautv. & C.A.Mey.) Á.Löve & D.Löve; Carex gaudichaudiana var. humilior Kük.; Carex spongiifolia A.E.Kozhevn.

Species of grass-like plant

Carex appendiculata is a species of sedge. It is native to northern and eastern Asia and New Guinea.
