= Carex vulpinaris =

Scientific classification
- Kingdom: Plantae
- Clade: Tracheophytes
- Clade: Angiosperms
- Clade: Monocots
- Clade: Commelinids
- Order: Poales
- Family: Cyperaceae
- Genus: Carex
- Species: C. vulpinaris

Binomial name
- Carex vulpinaris Nees

Species of sedge

Carex vulpinaris is a tussock-forming species of perennial sedge in the family Cyperaceae. It is native to parts of South Asia and Central Asia including Afghanistan, Tajikistan and Pakistan westerns parts of the Himalaya.

It was described by the botanist Christian Gottfried Daniel Nees von Esenbeck in 1834 as published in Contributions to the Botany of India.

== See also ==
- List of Carex species
