= Carex psychrophila =

Scientific classification
- Kingdom: Plantae
- Clade: Tracheophytes
- Clade: Angiosperms
- Clade: Monocots
- Clade: Commelinids
- Order: Poales
- Family: Cyperaceae
- Genus: Carex
- Species: C. psychrophila

Binomial name
- Carex psychrophila Nees

Species of sedge

Carex psychrophila is a tussock-forming species of perennial sedge in the family Cyperaceae. It is native to parts of Asia from Afghanistan in the west to southern parts of central China in the east.

It was described by the botanist Christian Gottfried Daniel Nees von Esenbeck in 1834 as published in Contributions to the Botany of India.

== See also ==
- List of Carex species
