= Carex gammiei =

Scientific classification
- Kingdom: Plantae
- Clade: Tracheophytes
- Clade: Angiosperms
- Clade: Monocots
- Clade: Commelinids
- Order: Poales
- Family: Cyperaceae
- Genus: Carex
- Species: C. gammiei

Binomial name
- Carex gammiei (C.B.Clarke) S.R.Zhang & O.Yano

Synonyms
- Kobresia gammiei C.B.Clarke; Kobresia williamsii T.Koyama

Species of sedge

Carex gammiei is a tussock-forming perennial in the family Cyperaceae. It is endemic to the eastern Himalaya including Nepal and Tibet.

== See also ==
- List of Carex species
