= Carex macrosolen =

Scientific classification
- Kingdom: Plantae
- Clade: Tracheophytes
- Clade: Angiosperms
- Clade: Monocots
- Clade: Commelinids
- Order: Poales
- Family: Cyperaceae
- Genus: Carex
- Species: C. macrosolen

Binomial name
- Carex macrosolen Steud.

Species of plant

Carex macrosolen is a tussock-forming species of perennial sedge in the family Cyperaceae. It is native to southern parts of South America.

It was first described by the botanist Ernst Gottlieb von Steudel in 1855 as a part of the work Synopsis plantarum glumacearum. The only synonym is Carex macrocarpa.

== See also ==
- List of Carex species
