= Carex squamiformis =

Scientific classification
- Kingdom: Plantae
- Clade: Embryophytes
- Clade: Tracheophytes
- Clade: Spermatophytes
- Clade: Angiosperms
- Clade: Monocots
- Clade: Commelinids
- Order: Poales
- Family: Cyperaceae
- Genus: Carex
- Species: C. squamiformis

Binomial name
- Carex squamiformis (Y.C.Yang) S.R.Zhang

Species of sedge

Carex squamiformis is a tussock-forming perennial in the family Cyperaceae. It is endemic to central and western parts of China in Gansu and Qinghai provinces as well as in the Sikkim province of north western India.

== See also ==
- List of Carex species
