= Carex kanaii =

Scientific classification
- Kingdom: Plantae
- Clade: Tracheophytes
- Clade: Angiosperms
- Clade: Monocots
- Clade: Commelinids
- Order: Poales
- Family: Cyperaceae
- Genus: Carex
- Species: C. kanaii

Binomial name
- Carex kanaii (Rajbh. & H.Ohba) S.R.Zhang & O.Yano

Synonyms
- Kobresia kanaii Rajbh. & H.Ohba

Species of sedge

Carex kanaii is a tussock-forming perennial in the family Cyperaceae. It is endemic from the eastern Himalaya through Nepal and Sikkim.

== See also ==
- List of Carex species
