= Carex mucronatiformis =

Scientific classification
- Kingdom: Plantae
- Clade: Embryophytes
- Clade: Tracheophytes
- Clade: Spermatophytes
- Clade: Angiosperms
- Clade: Monocots
- Clade: Commelinids
- Order: Poales
- Family: Cyperaceae
- Genus: Carex
- Species: C. mucronatiformis

Binomial name
- Carex mucronatiformis Tang & F.T.Wang ex S.Yun Liang

Species of sedge

Carex mucronatiformis is a tussock-forming perennial in the family Cyperaceae. It is endemic to north central parts of China in the province of Qinghai and Gansu.

== See also ==
- List of Carex species
