= Carex peichuniana =

Scientific classification
- Kingdom: Plantae
- Clade: Embryophytes
- Clade: Tracheophytes
- Clade: Angiosperms
- Clade: Monocots
- Clade: Commelinids
- Order: Poales
- Family: Cyperaceae
- Genus: Carex
- Species: C. peichuniana

Binomial name
- Carex peichuniana S.R.Zhang

Synonyms
- Kobresia inflata P.C.Li

Species of sedge

Carex peichuniana is a tussock-forming perennial in the family Cyperaceae. It is endemic to eastern parts of Himalaya including Tibet and south-central parts of China.

== See also ==
- List of Carex species
