= Carex raphidocarpa =

Scientific classification
- Kingdom: Plantae
- Clade: Tracheophytes
- Clade: Angiosperms
- Clade: Monocots
- Clade: Commelinids
- Order: Poales
- Family: Cyperaceae
- Genus: Carex
- Species: C. raphidocarpa

Binomial name
- Carex raphidocarpa Nees

Species of sedge

Carex raphidocarpa is a tussock-forming species of perennial sedge in the family Cyperaceae. It is native to India.

It was described by the botanist Christian Gottfried Daniel Nees von Esenbeck in 1834 as published in Contributions to the Botany of India.

== See also ==
- List of Carex species
