= Carex atropicta =

Scientific classification
- Kingdom: Plantae
- Clade: Tracheophytes
- Clade: Angiosperms
- Clade: Monocots
- Clade: Commelinids
- Order: Poales
- Family: Cyperaceae
- Genus: Carex
- Species: C. atropicta

Binomial name
- Carex atropicta Steud.

Synonyms
- Carex fuegina Phil.; Carex lechleri Phil.; Carex pampae Kalela; Carex peraltae Phil.; Limivasculum atropictum (Steud.) Fedde & J.Schust.

Species of grass-like plant

Carex atropicta is a species of sedge native to Chile and Argentina.
