= Carex spicigera =

Scientific classification
- Kingdom: Plantae
- Clade: Tracheophytes
- Clade: Angiosperms
- Clade: Monocots
- Clade: Commelinids
- Order: Poales
- Family: Cyperaceae
- Genus: Carex
- Species: C. spicigera

Binomial name
- Carex spicigera Nees

Species of sedge

Carex spicigera is a tussock-forming species of perennial sedge in the family Cyperaceae. It is native to Sri Lanka.

It was described by the botanist Christian Gottfried Daniel Nees von Esenbeck in 1834 as published in Contributions to the Botany of India.

== See also ==
- List of Carex species
