= Carex pseudolaxa =

Scientific classification
- Kingdom: Plantae
- Clade: Tracheophytes
- Clade: Angiosperms
- Clade: Monocots
- Clade: Commelinids
- Order: Poales
- Family: Cyperaceae
- Genus: Carex
- Species: C. pseudolaxa

Binomial name
- Carex pseudolaxa (C.B.Clarke) O.Yano & S.R.Zhang

Species of sedge

Carex pseudolaxa is a tussock-forming perennial in the family Cyperaceae. It is endemic to parts of Central Asia in the west to the Tibet and the Himalayas in the east.

== See also ==
- List of Carex species
