= Carex bistaminata =

Scientific classification
- Kingdom: Plantae
- Clade: Tracheophytes
- Clade: Angiosperms
- Clade: Monocots
- Clade: Commelinids
- Order: Poales
- Family: Cyperaceae
- Genus: Carex
- Species: C. bistaminata

Binomial name
- Carex bistaminata (W.Z.Di & M.J.Zhong) S.R.Zhang

Species of sedge

Carex bistaminata is a tussock-forming perennial in the family Cyperaceae. It is endemic to Mongolia and north central parts of China including the provinces of Qinghai and Xinjiang.

== See also ==
- List of Carex species
