= Carex × abitibiana =

Scientific classification
- Kingdom: Plantae
- Clade: Tracheophytes
- Clade: Angiosperms
- Clade: Monocots
- Clade: Commelinids
- Order: Poales
- Family: Cyperaceae
- Genus: Carex
- Species: C. × abitibiana

Binomial name
- Carex × abitibiana Lepage

Species of plant in the sedge family

Carex × abitibiana is a hybrid species of sedge that was first described by Lepage in 1959. It is native to Quebec.

== Description ==
Leaves are simple and alternate, entire and with parallel venation. Inflorescence is a spike. The fruit is an achene.
