= Carex perdentata =

Scientific classification
- Kingdom: Plantae
- Clade: Tracheophytes
- Clade: Angiosperms
- Clade: Monocots
- Clade: Commelinids
- Order: Poales
- Family: Cyperaceae
- Genus: Carex
- Species: C. perdentata

Binomial name
- Carex perdentata S.D.Jones

Species of plant

Carex perdentata, the Texas meadow sedge, is a species of flowering plant in the family Cyperaceae, native to the U.S. states of Oklahoma and Texas. A perennial of savannas and open mesic forests, it can be used as a grass substitute in lawns, but requires a great deal of water.
