= Carex hohxilensis =

Scientific classification
- Kingdom: Plantae
- Clade: Tracheophytes
- Clade: Angiosperms
- Clade: Monocots
- Clade: Commelinids
- Order: Poales
- Family: Cyperaceae
- Genus: Carex
- Species: C. hohxilensis

Binomial name
- Carex hohxilensis (R.F.Huang) S.R.Zhang

Species of sedge

Carex hohxilensis is a tussock-forming perennial in the family Cyperaceae. It is endemic to parts of Tibet and northern central China including the provinces of Gansu and Qinghai.

== See also ==
- List of Carex species
