= Carex nodosa =

Scientific classification
- Kingdom: Plantae
- Clade: Tracheophytes
- Clade: Angiosperms
- Clade: Monocots
- Clade: Commelinids
- Order: Poales
- Family: Cyperaceae
- Genus: Carex
- Species: C. nodosa

Binomial name
- Carex nodosa S.R.Zhang, J.Zhang, Z.Y.Liu, S.Qu & R.G.Han

Species of sedge

Carex nodosa is a tussock-forming perennial in the family Cyperaceae. It is endemic to parts of south central China in the province of Chongqing.

== See also ==
- List of Carex species
