= Carex austro-occidentalis =

Scientific classification
- Kingdom: Plantae
- Clade: Tracheophytes
- Clade: Angiosperms
- Clade: Monocots
- Clade: Commelinids
- Order: Poales
- Family: Cyperaceae
- Genus: Carex
- Species: C. austro-occidentalis

Binomial name
- Carex austro-occidentalis F.T.Wang & Tang ex Y.C.Tang

Species of sedge

Carex austro-occidentalis is a tussock-forming perennial in the family Cyperaceae. It is endemic to south central parts of China in Sichuan province.

== See also ==
- List of Carex species
