= Carex saxicola =

Scientific classification
- Kingdom: Plantae
- Clade: Embryophytes
- Clade: Tracheophytes
- Clade: Spermatophytes
- Clade: Angiosperms
- Clade: Monocots
- Clade: Commelinids
- Order: Poales
- Family: Cyperaceae
- Genus: Carex
- Species: C. saxicola

Binomial name
- Carex saxicola Tang & F.T.Wang

Species of sedge

Carex saxicola is a tussock-forming perennial in the family Cyperaceae. It is endemic to southern parts of China on the island of Hainan.

== See also ==
- List of Carex species
