= Carex aphyllopus =

Scientific classification
- Kingdom: Plantae
- Clade: Tracheophytes
- Clade: Angiosperms
- Clade: Monocots
- Clade: Commelinids
- Order: Poales
- Family: Cyperaceae
- Genus: Carex
- Species: C. aphyllopus

Binomial name
- Carex aphyllopus Kük.

Species of plant

Carex aphyllopus is a species of sedge. Its native range is Central Japan.

== Infraspecies ==
- Carex aphyllopus var. aphyllopus
- Carex aphyllopus var. impura (Ohwi) T.Koyama
