= Carex chapmanii =

Scientific classification
- Kingdom: Plantae
- Clade: Tracheophytes
- Clade: Angiosperms
- Clade: Monocots
- Clade: Commelinids
- Order: Poales
- Family: Cyperaceae
- Genus: Carex
- Species: C. chapmanii

Binomial name
- Carex chapmanii Steud.

Species of plant

Carex chapmanii, commonly referred to as Chapman's sedge, is a tussock-forming species of perennial sedge in the family Cyperaceae. It is native to temperate parts of the south-eastern United States.

== See also ==
- List of Carex species
