= Carex qingliangensis =

Scientific classification
- Kingdom: Plantae
- Clade: Tracheophytes
- Clade: Angiosperms
- Clade: Monocots
- Clade: Commelinids
- Order: Poales
- Family: Cyperaceae
- Genus: Carex
- Species: C. qingliangensis

Binomial name
- Carex qingliangensis Weng, Zhang & Xu

Species of grass-like plant

Carex qingliangensis is a species of sedge found on mountain slopes at an elevation of 500–1,300 metres (1,600–4,300 ft) in Zhejiang province in eastern China.
