= Carex tsoi =

Scientific classification
- Kingdom: Plantae
- Clade: Embryophytes
- Clade: Tracheophytes
- Clade: Spermatophytes
- Clade: Angiosperms
- Clade: Monocots
- Clade: Commelinids
- Order: Poales
- Family: Cyperaceae
- Genus: Carex
- Species: C. tsoi

Binomial name
- Carex tsoi Merr. & Chun

Species of plant

Carex tsoi is a species of sedge in the family Cyperaceae, native to Hainan, China. It was formerly thought to be in section Radicales.
