= Carex lingii =

Scientific classification
- Kingdom: Plantae
- Clade: Tracheophytes
- Clade: Angiosperms
- Clade: Monocots
- Clade: Commelinids
- Order: Poales
- Family: Cyperaceae
- Genus: Carex
- Species: C. lingii

Binomial name
- Carex lingii F.T.Wang & Tang

Species of sedge

Carex lingii is a tussock-forming perennial in the family Cyperaceae. It is endemic to south eastern parts of China in the Fujian and Zhejiang provinces.

== See also ==
- List of Carex species
