= Carex algida =

Scientific classification
- Kingdom: Plantae
- Clade: Tracheophytes
- Clade: Angiosperms
- Clade: Monocots
- Clade: Commelinids
- Order: Poales
- Family: Cyperaceae
- Genus: Carex
- Species: C. algida

Binomial name
- Carex algida Turcz. ex V.I.Krecz.

Species of plant

Carex algida is a tussock-forming species of perennial sedge in the family Cyperaceae. It is native to parts of Russia, Norway and Sweden.

== See also ==
- List of Carex species
