= Carex humboldtiana =

Scientific classification
- Kingdom: Plantae
- Clade: Tracheophytes
- Clade: Angiosperms
- Clade: Monocots
- Clade: Commelinids
- Order: Poales
- Family: Cyperaceae
- Genus: Carex
- Species: C. humboldtiana

Binomial name
- Carex humboldtiana Steud.

Species of plant

Carex humboldtiana is a tussock-forming species of perennial sedge in the family Cyperaceae. It is native to parts of Central America and South America.

== See also ==
- List of Carex species
