= Carex aristulifera =

Scientific classification
- Kingdom: Plantae
- Clade: Tracheophytes
- Clade: Angiosperms
- Clade: Monocots
- Clade: Commelinids
- Order: Poales
- Family: Cyperaceae
- Genus: Carex
- Species: C. aristulifera

Binomial name
- Carex aristulifera P.C.Li

Species of sedge

Carex aristulifera is a tussock-forming perennial in the family Cyperaceae. It is native to south-central parts of the China.

== See also ==
- List of Carex species
