= Carex toyoshimae =

Scientific classification
- Kingdom: Plantae
- Clade: Tracheophytes
- Clade: Angiosperms
- Clade: Monocots
- Clade: Commelinids
- Order: Poales
- Family: Cyperaceae
- Genus: Carex
- Species: C. toyoshimae

Binomial name
- Carex toyoshimae Tuyama

Synonyms
- Carex augustini Tuyama

Species of grass-like plant

Carex toyoshimae is a species of sedge native to Japan.
