= Carex altaica =

Scientific classification
- Kingdom: Plantae
- Clade: Tracheophytes
- Clade: Angiosperms
- Clade: Monocots
- Clade: Commelinids
- Order: Poales
- Family: Cyperaceae
- Genus: Carex
- Species: C. altaica

Binomial name
- Carex altaica (Gorodkov) V.I.Krecz.

Species of grass-like plant

Carex altaica is a species of sedge and is native to Mongolia, Siberia, and northwestern China.
