= Carex atrofuscoides =

Scientific classification
- Kingdom: Plantae
- Clade: Tracheophytes
- Clade: Angiosperms
- Clade: Monocots
- Clade: Commelinids
- Order: Poales
- Family: Cyperaceae
- Genus: Carex
- Species: C. atrofuscoides

Binomial name
- Carex atrofuscoides K.T.Fu

Species of grass-like plant

Carex atrofuscoides is a species of sedge. Its native range is Tibet to Central China.
