= Carex anomoea =

Scientific classification
- Kingdom: Plantae
- Clade: Tracheophytes
- Clade: Angiosperms
- Clade: Monocots
- Clade: Commelinids
- Order: Poales
- Family: Cyperaceae
- Genus: Carex
- Species: C. anomoea

Binomial name
- Carex anomoea Hand.-Mazz.

Species of grass-like plant

Carex anomoea is a species of sedge. Its native range is Nepal to China.
