= Carex wenshanensis =

Scientific classification
- Kingdom: Plantae
- Clade: Tracheophytes
- Clade: Angiosperms
- Clade: Monocots
- Clade: Commelinids
- Order: Poales
- Family: Cyperaceae
- Genus: Carex
- Species: C. wenshanensis

Binomial name
- Carex wenshanensis L.K.Dai

Species of sedge

Carex wenshanensis is a species of sedge native to China.
