= Carex balansae =

Scientific classification
- Kingdom: Plantae
- Clade: Tracheophytes
- Clade: Angiosperms
- Clade: Monocots
- Clade: Commelinids
- Order: Poales
- Family: Cyperaceae
- Genus: Carex
- Species: C. balansae

Binomial name
- Carex balansae Franch.

Species of grass-like plant

Carex balansae is a species of sedge native to Vietnam.
