= Gladiolus dichrous =

Scientific classification
- Kingdom: Plantae
- Clade: Tracheophytes
- Clade: Angiosperms
- Clade: Monocots
- Order: Asparagales
- Family: Iridaceae
- Genus: Gladiolus
- Species: G. dichrous

Binomial name
- Gladiolus dichrous (Bullock) Goldblatt

Synonyms
- Oenostachys dichroa Bullock

Species of flowering plant

Gladiolus dichrous is a species of flowering plant found in mountainous regions of South Sudan, Kenya and Uganda. It has relatively small flowers usually hidden under large green or rose coloured bracts.
