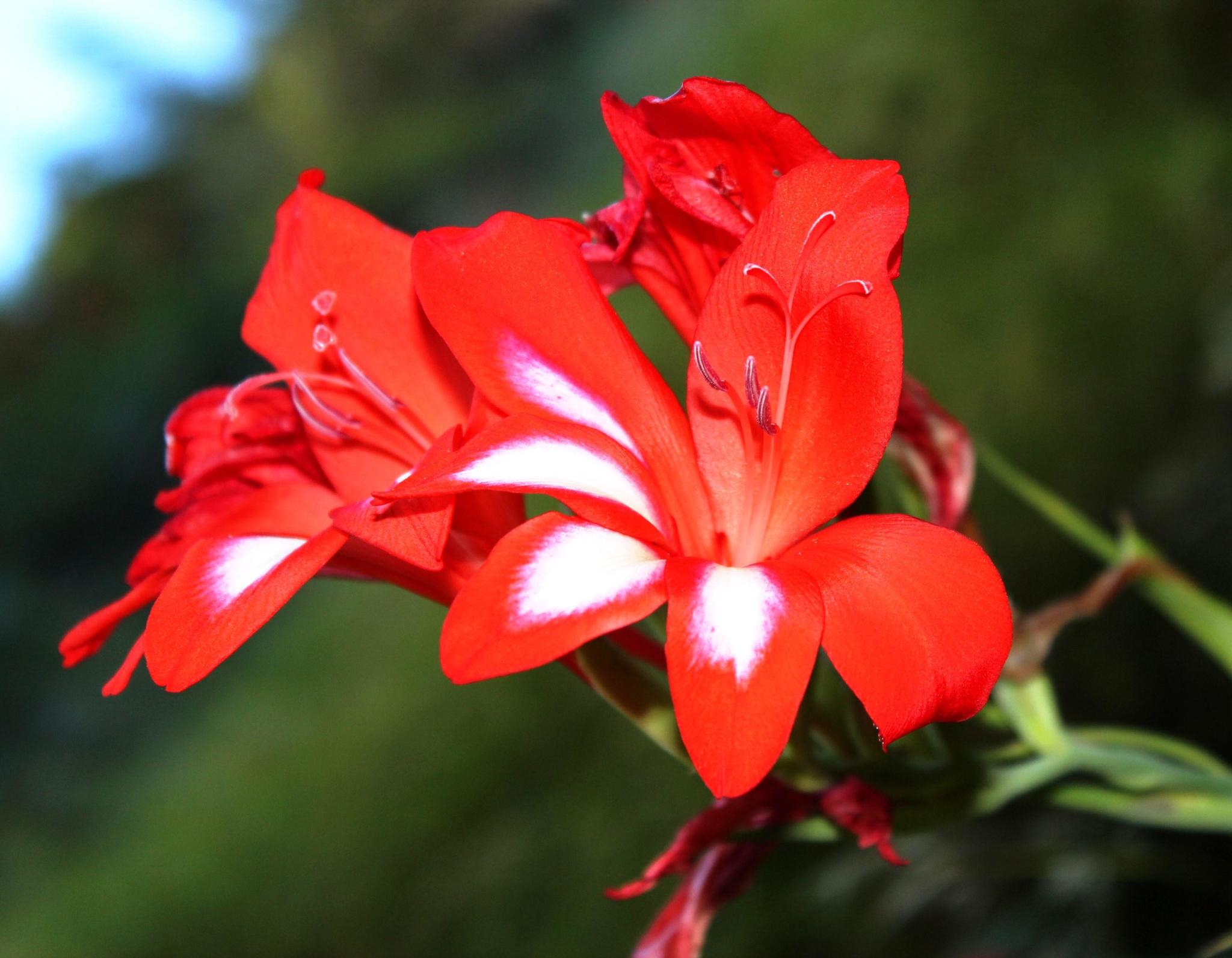

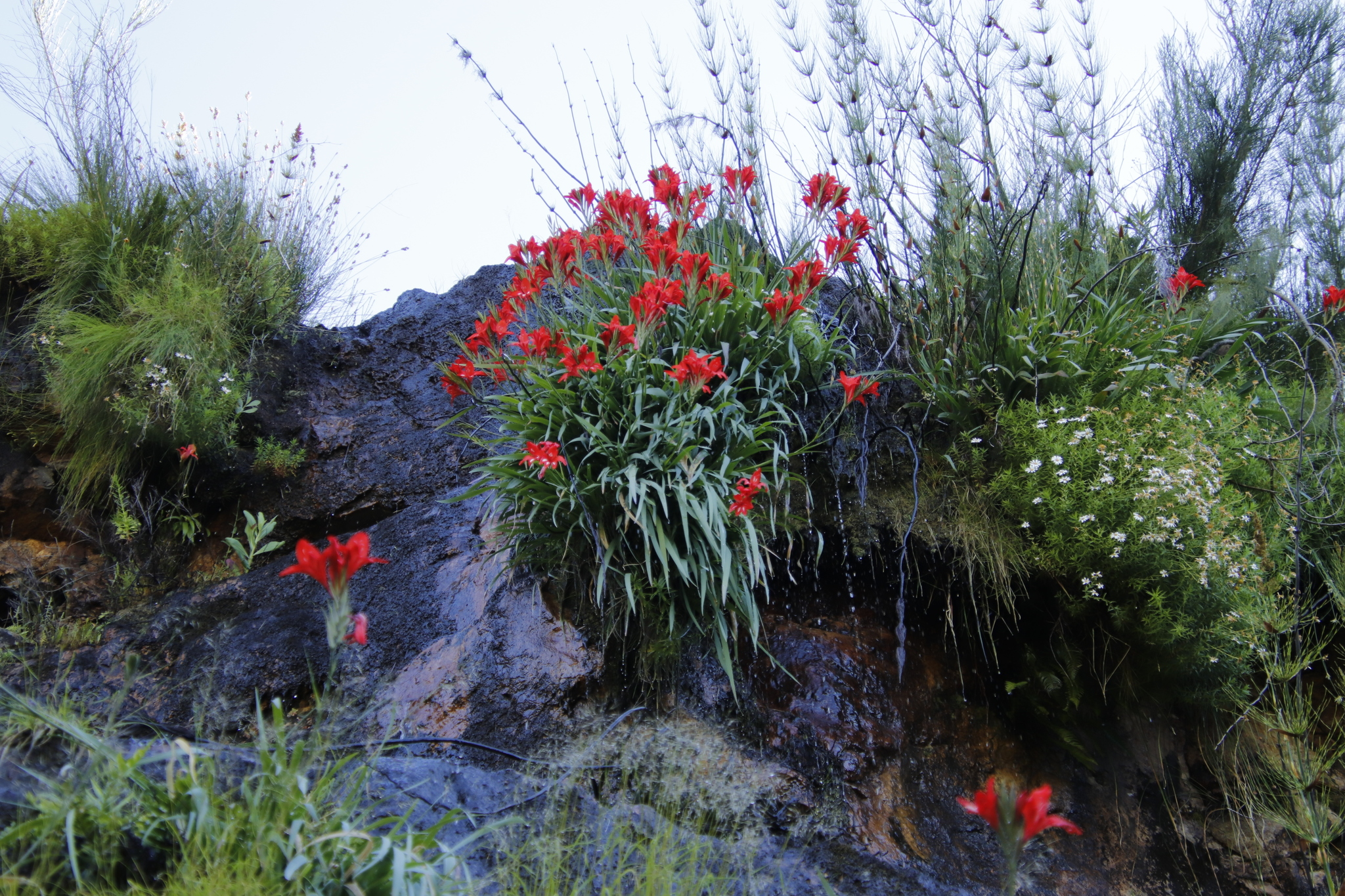
- The waterfall lily growing on the side of a wet precipice of the Wemmershoek Plateau, Haweqwa Nature Reserve

Conservation status
- Least Concern (SANBI Red List)

Scientific classification
- Kingdom: Plantae
- Clade: Tracheophytes
- Clade: Angiosperms
- Clade: Monocots
- Order: Asparagales
- Family: Iridaceae
- Genus: Gladiolus
- Species: G. cardinalis

Binomial name
- Gladiolus cardinalis Curtis

Synonyms
- Gladiolus speciosus Eckl.

= Gladiolus cardinalis =

Plant endemic to South Africa

Gladiolus cardinalis, commonly called the waterfall lily, is a species of cormous flowering plant endemic to the Western Cape in South Africa.

It's also called the New Year lily (Nuwejaarsblom in Afrikaans) and cardinal red sword lily.

== Range and habitat ==
Gladiolus cardinalis is found on the side of waterfalls in the south-western mountains of the Western Cape.
