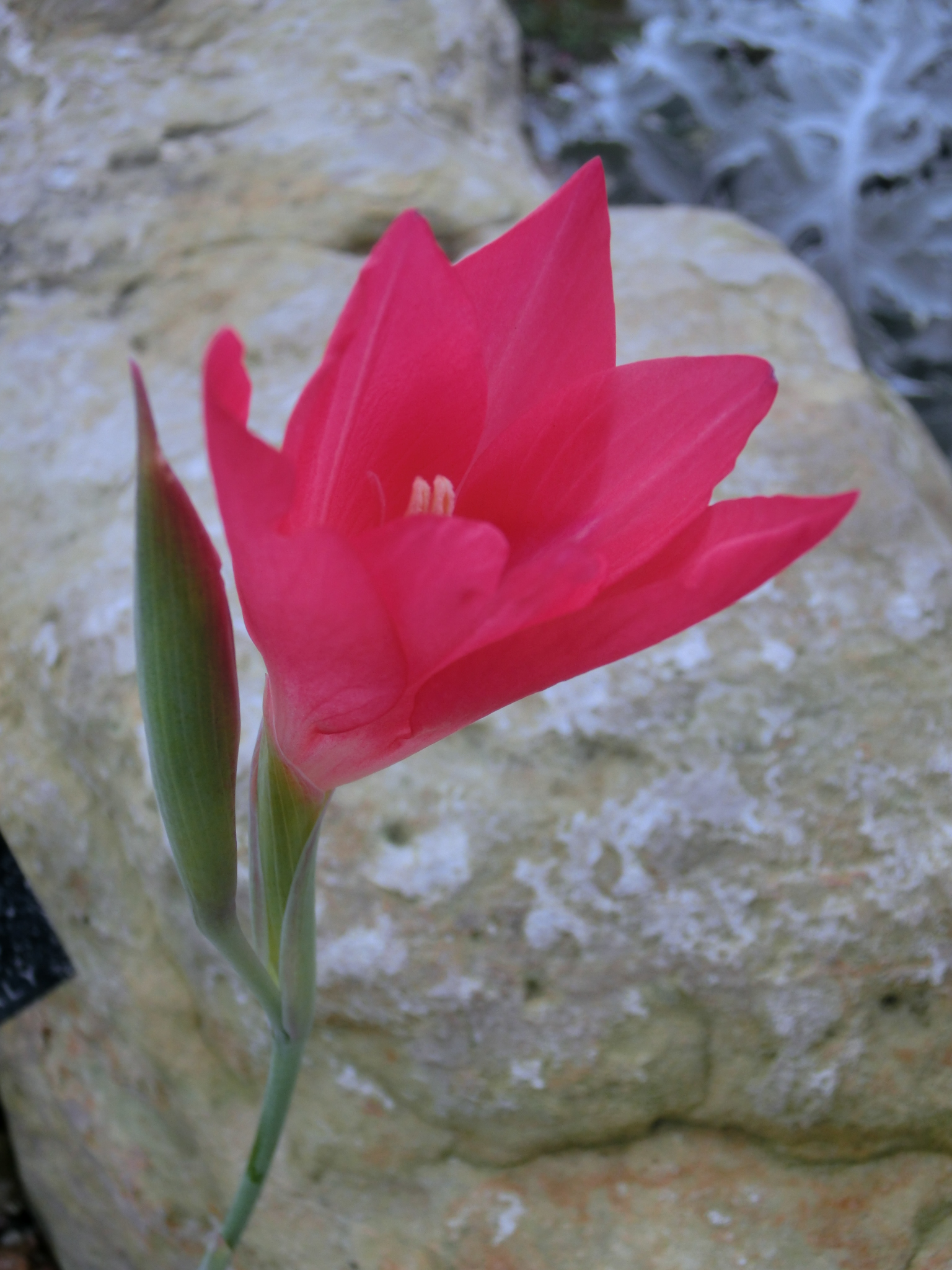

Scientific classification
- Kingdom: Plantae
- Clade: Tracheophytes
- Clade: Angiosperms
- Clade: Monocots
- Order: Asparagales
- Family: Iridaceae
- Genus: Gladiolus
- Species: G. carmineus

Binomial name
- Gladiolus carmineus C.H.Wright

= Gladiolus carmineus =

Species of plant

Gladiolus carmineus is a perennial plant in the family Iridaceae. It is native to the Western Cape and occurs from Cape Hangklip to Cape Infanta. The plant has an occurrence area of less than 20 square kilometres (7.7 sq mi) and is threatened by development on the coast.

== Gallery ==
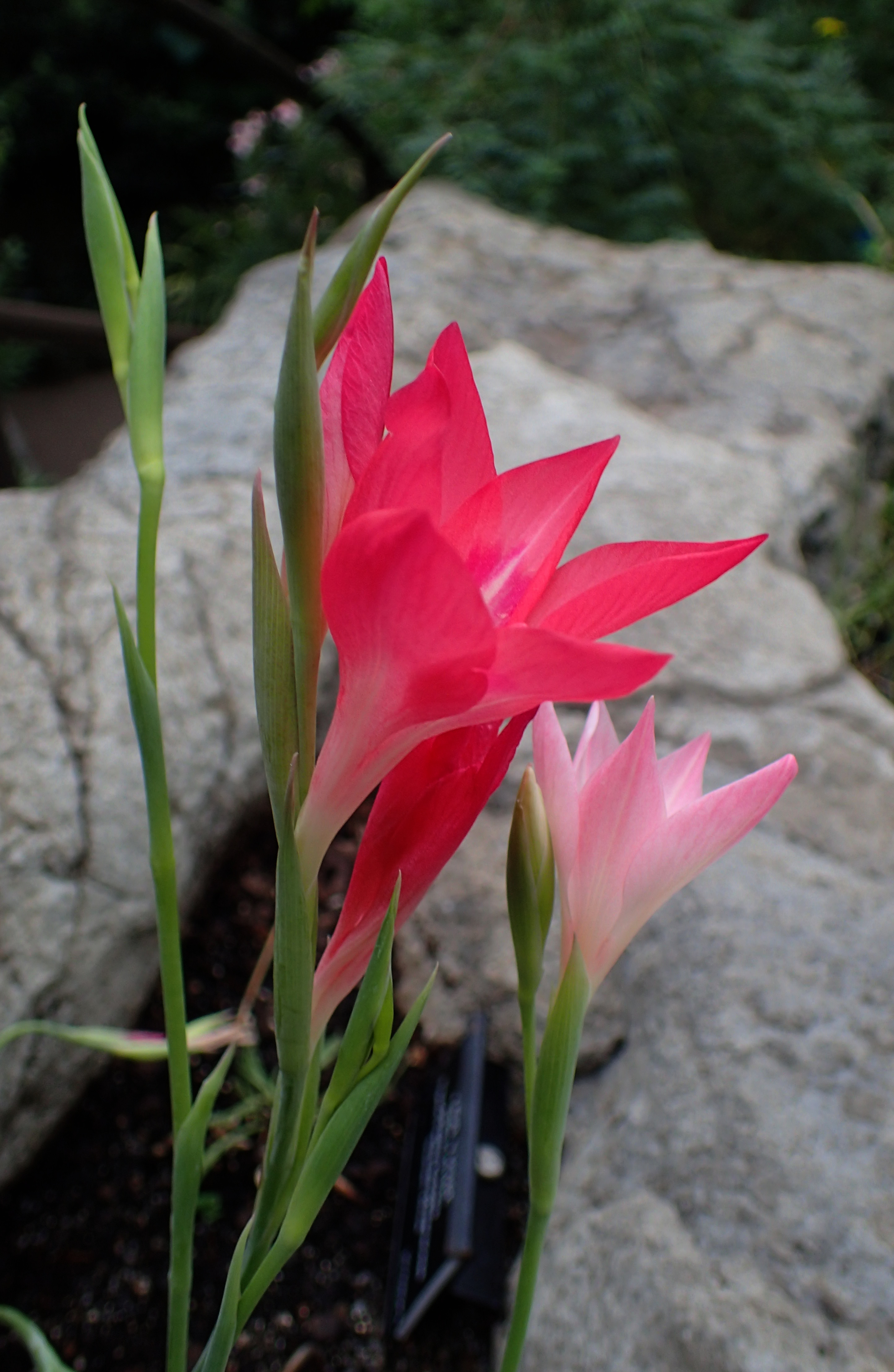
