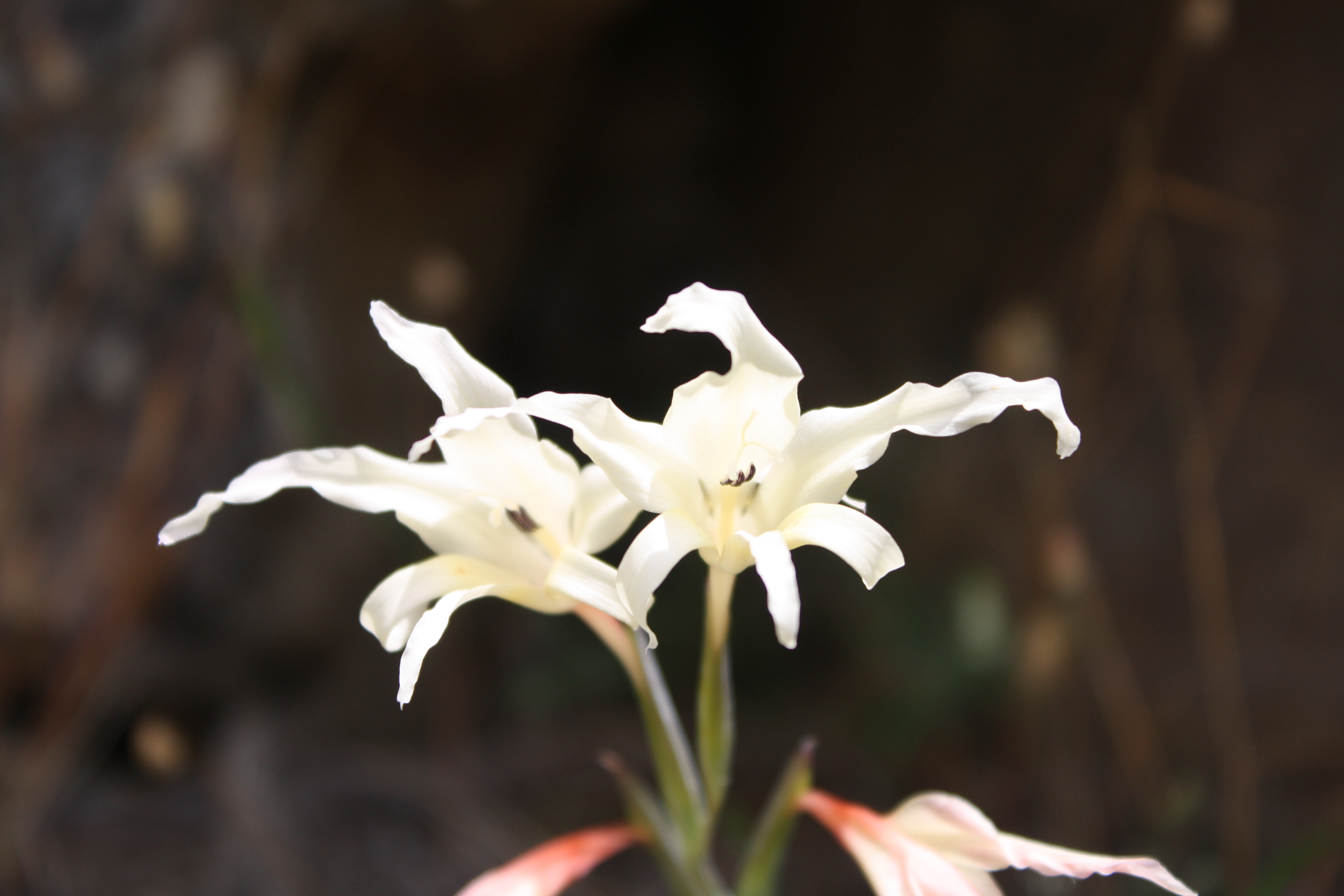

Scientific classification
- Kingdom: Plantae
- Clade: Tracheophytes
- Clade: Angiosperms
- Clade: Monocots
- Order: Asparagales
- Family: Iridaceae
- Genus: Gladiolus
- Species: G. undulatus

Binomial name
- Gladiolus undulatus L.

= Gladiolus undulatus =

Species of flowering plant

Gladiolus undulatus is a plant species in the family Iridaceae.
