= Gladiolus mariae =

Scientific classification
- Kingdom: Plantae
- Clade: Tracheophytes
- Clade: Angiosperms
- Clade: Monocots
- Order: Asparagales
- Family: Iridaceae
- Genus: Gladiolus
- Species: G. mariae

Binomial name
- Gladiolus mariae van der Burgt

Species of flowering plant

Gladiolus mariae is a species of the genus Gladiolus of perennial cormous flowering plants in the family Iridaceae.

The species was first described in 2019, found growing endemicly on two table mountains in the Kounounkan Forest Reserve near Moussaya, Forécariah, Guinea, West Africa. It was named as one of Kew Gardens Top 10 plants discovered in 2019 and has been assessed as potentially critically endangered.

== Description ==
Gladiolus mariae is similar in appearance to Gladiolus sudanicus and grows to between 28–160 centimetres (11–63 in). It has up to 6 orange flowers.
