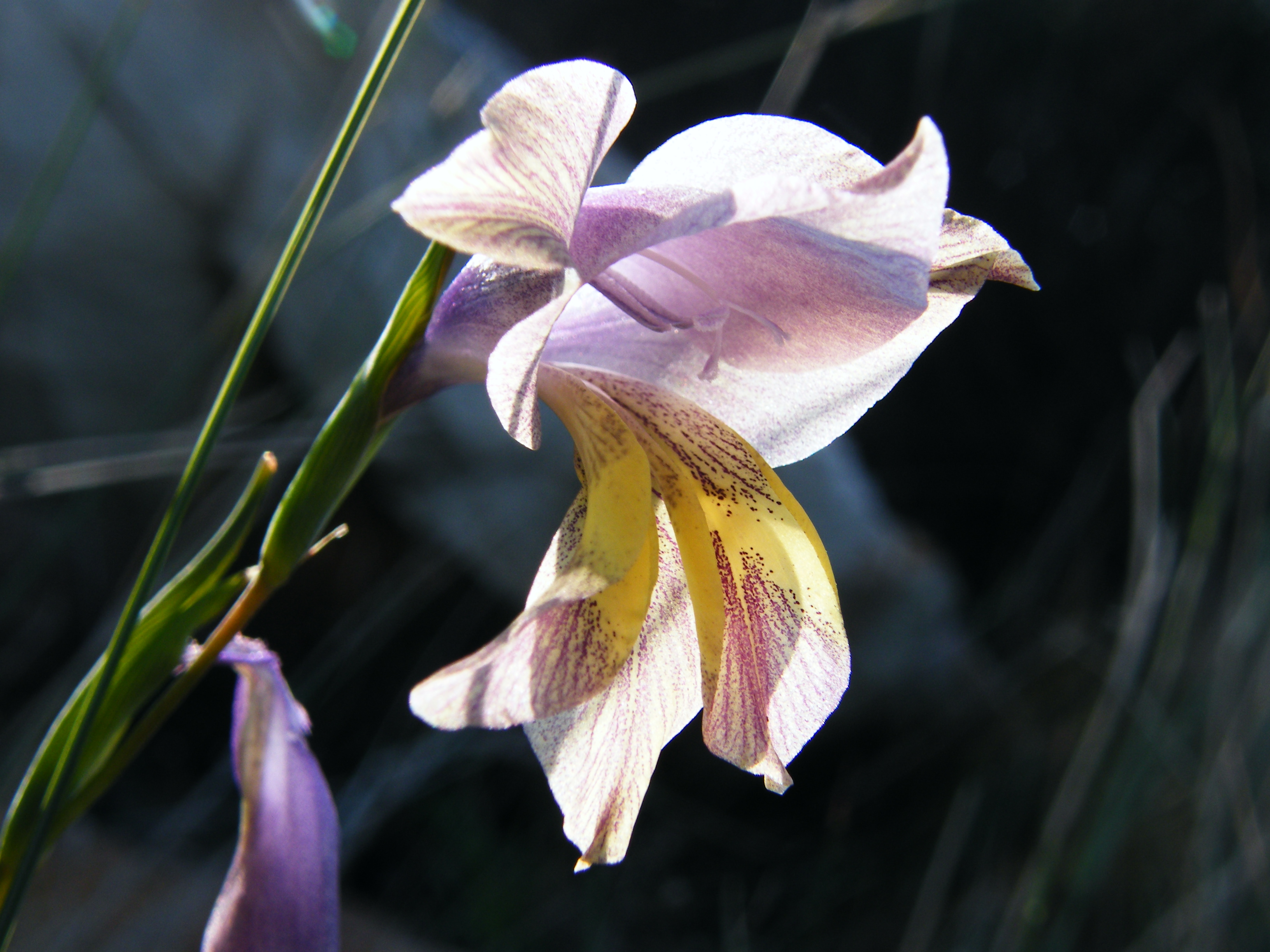

Scientific classification
- Kingdom: Plantae
- Clade: Embryophytes
- Clade: Tracheophytes
- Clade: Angiosperms
- Clade: Monocots
- Order: Asparagales
- Family: Iridaceae
- Genus: Gladiolus
- Species: G. carinatus

Binomial name
- Gladiolus carinatus Aiton

Synonyms
- Gladiolus nivenii Baker; Gladiolus odorus Salisb.; Gladiolus ringens Andrews; Gladiolus superans N.E.Br.; Gladiolus tenellus Jacq.

= Gladiolus carinatus =

Species of flowering plant

Gladiolus carinatus, commonly as the blue Afrikaner, is a perennial plant belonging to the genus Gladiolus and is part of the fynbos. The plant is native to the Western Cape.

== Gallery ==
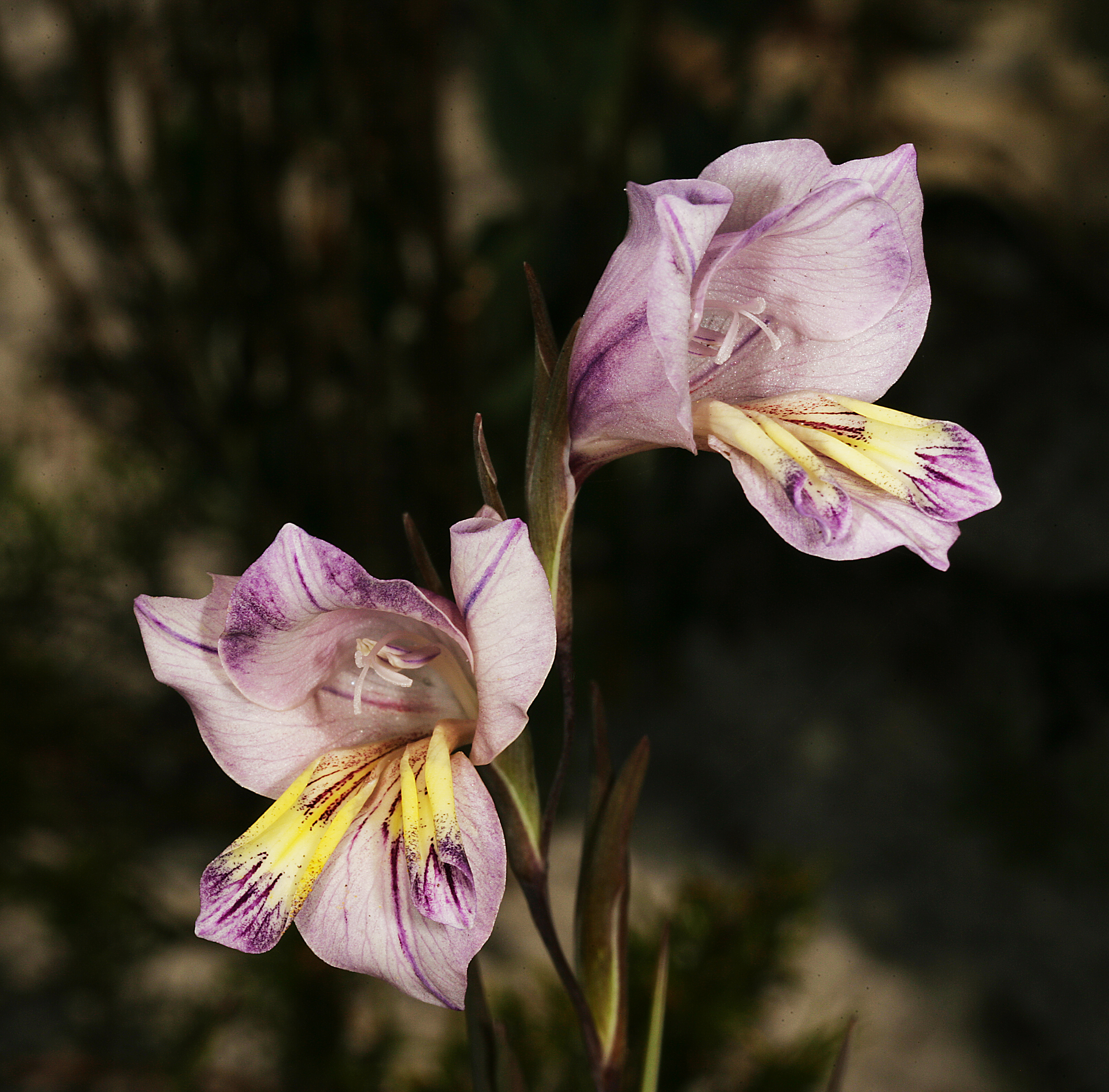

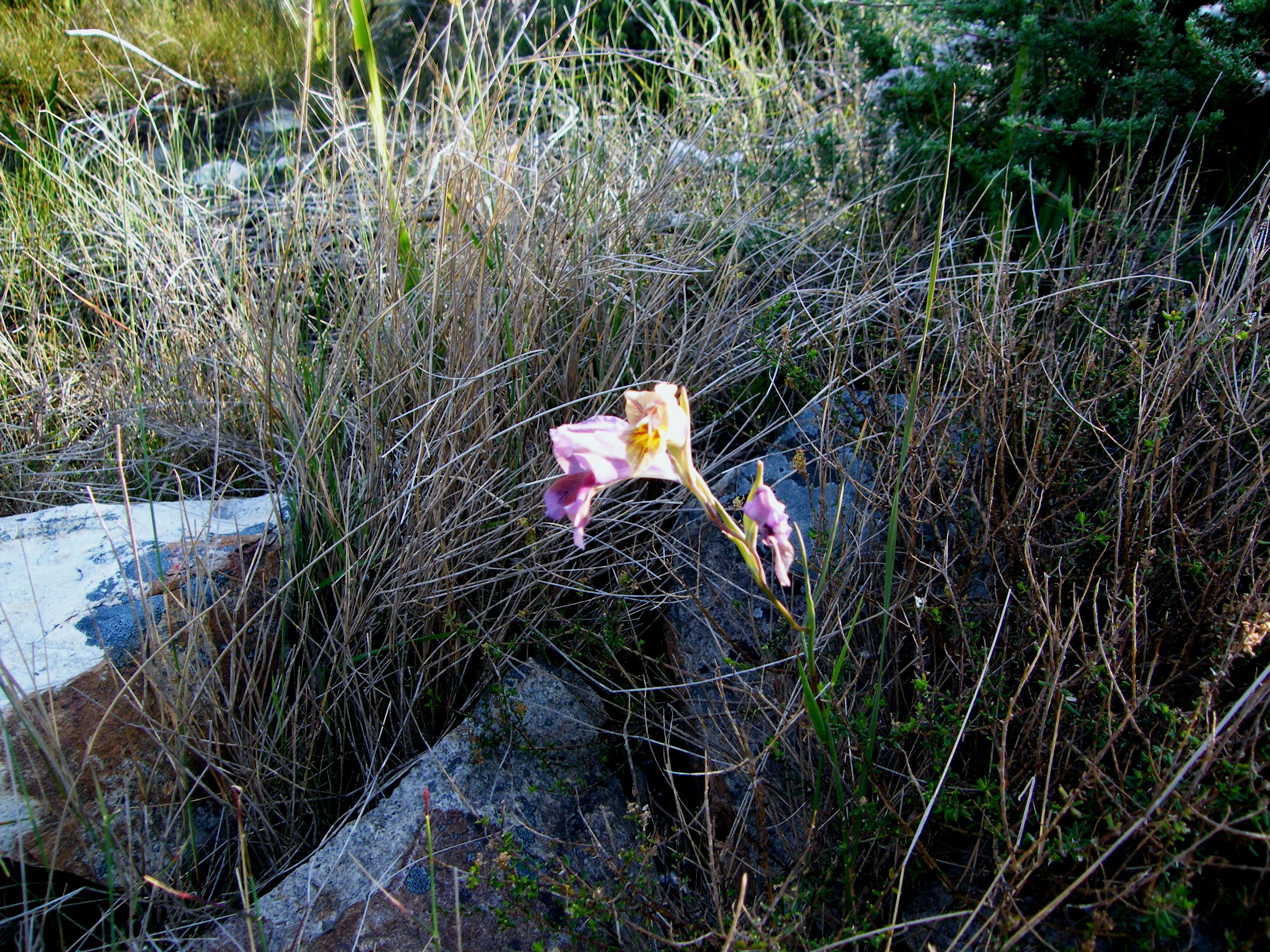
