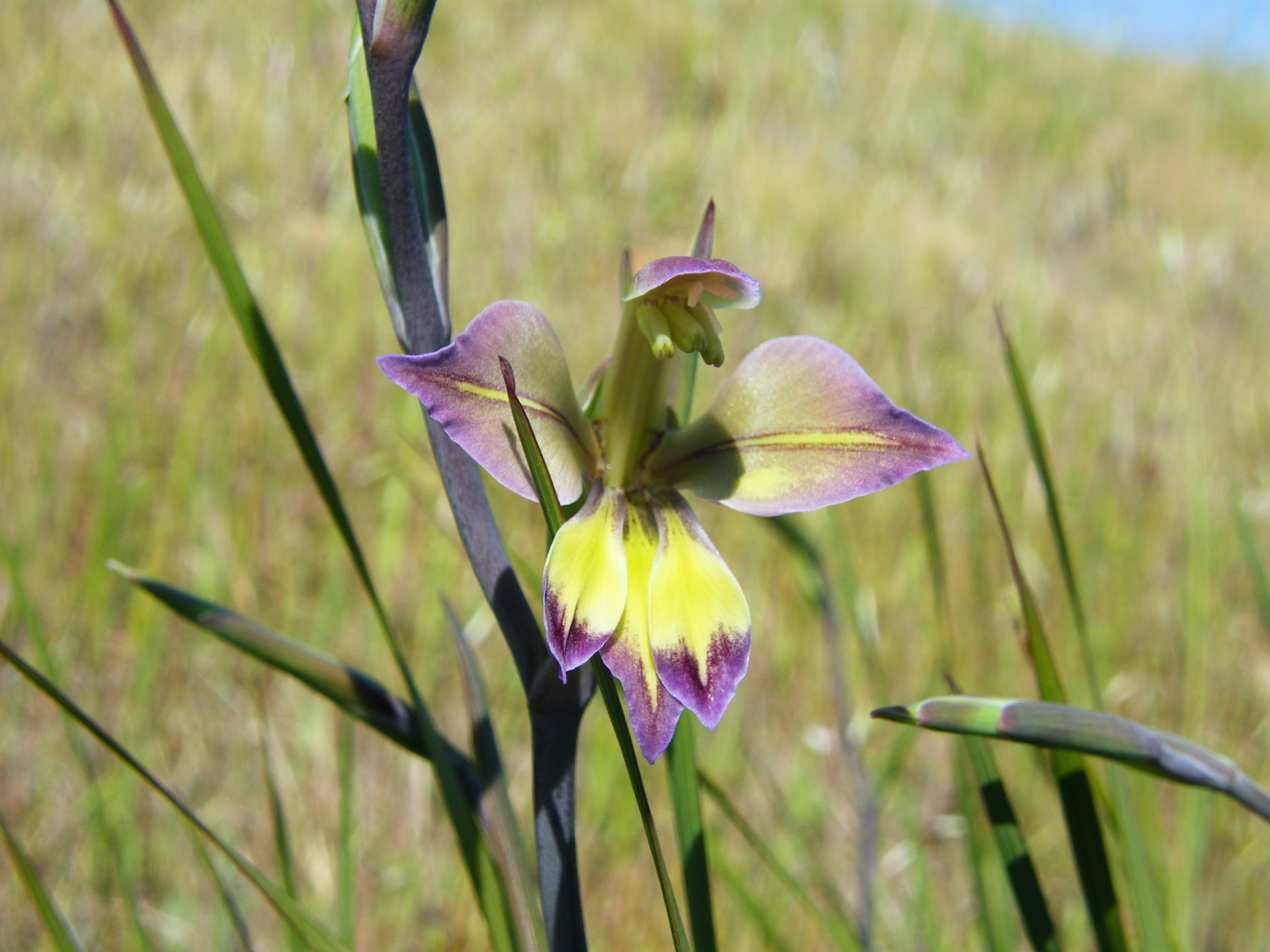

Scientific classification
- Kingdom: Plantae
- Clade: Tracheophytes
- Clade: Angiosperms
- Clade: Monocots
- Order: Asparagales
- Family: Iridaceae
- Genus: Gladiolus
- Species: G. orchidiflorus

Binomial name
- Gladiolus orchidiflorus Andrews

= Gladiolus orchidiflorus =

Species of flowering plant

Gladiolus orchidiflorus is a Gladiolus species found in growing in clay and sandstone soil in the grasslands of Namaqualand, South Africa.
