= Gladiolus splendens =

Conservation status
- Least Concern (SANBI Red List)

Scientific classification
- Kingdom: Plantae
- Clade: Tracheophytes
- Clade: Angiosperms
- Clade: Monocots
- Order: Asparagales
- Family: Iridaceae
- Genus: Gladiolus
- Species: G. splendens

Binomial name
- Gladiolus splendens (Sweet) Herb.

Synonyms
- Anisanthus splendens Sweet; Anomalesia splendens (Sweet) N.E.Br.; Antholyza afra Ker Gawl. ex Baker; Antholyza splendens (Sweet) Steud.; Petamenes splendens (Sweet) E.Phillips; Tritoniopsis afra Goldblatt

Species of plant

Gladiolus splendens is a species of perennial flowering plant belonging to the genus Gladiolus. It is a tuberous geophyte endemic to the west-central Cape Provinces of South Africa, where it ranges from the mountains north of Calvinia in the Northern Cape southwards along the Roggeveld Escarpment to the Moordenaars Karoo near Laingsburg in the Western Cape.
