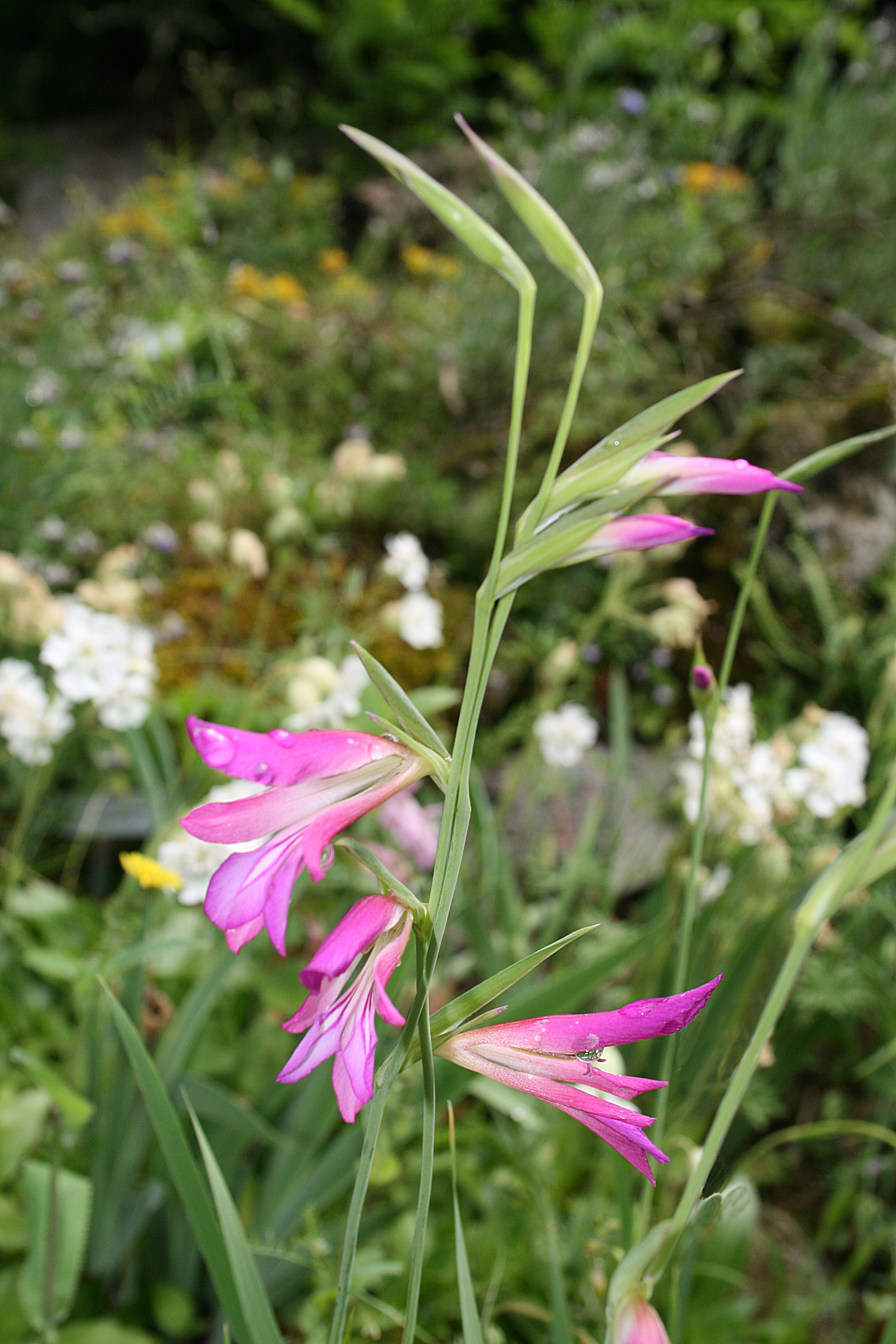
- Gladiolus italicus

Scientific classification
- Kingdom: Plantae
- Clade: Embryophytes
- Clade: Tracheophytes
- Clade: Spermatophytes
- Clade: Angiosperms
- Clade: Monocots
- Order: Asparagales
- Family: Iridaceae
- Subfamily: Crocoideae
- Tribe: Gladioleae
- Genus: Gladiolus; Tourn. ex L.

Type species
- Gladiolus communis L.

Species
- About 260, see text

Synonyms
- List: Antholyza L.; Liliogladiolus Christoph Jakob Trew; Cunonia Mill., nom. illeg.; Hebea R.Hedw.; Anisanthus Sweet; Sphaerospora Sweet, nom. inval.; Bertera Steud.; Petamenes Salisb. ex J.W.Loudon; Acidanthera Hochst.; Ballosporum Salisb.; Homoglossum Salisb.; Hyptissa Salisb.; Ophiolyza Salisb.; Ranisia Salisb.; Symphydolon Salisb.; Solenanthus Steud. ex Klatt; Keitia Regel; Oenostachys Bullock; Anomalesia N.E.Br.; Kentrosiphon N.E.Br.; Petamenes Salisb. ex N.E.Br., nom. illeg.; Dortania A.Chev.; × Gladanthera J.M.Wright; × Homoglad Ingram

= Gladiolus =

Genus of perennial flowering plants

Gladiolus (from Latin, the diminutive of gladius, a sword) is a genus of perennial cormous flowering plants in the iris family (Iridaceae).

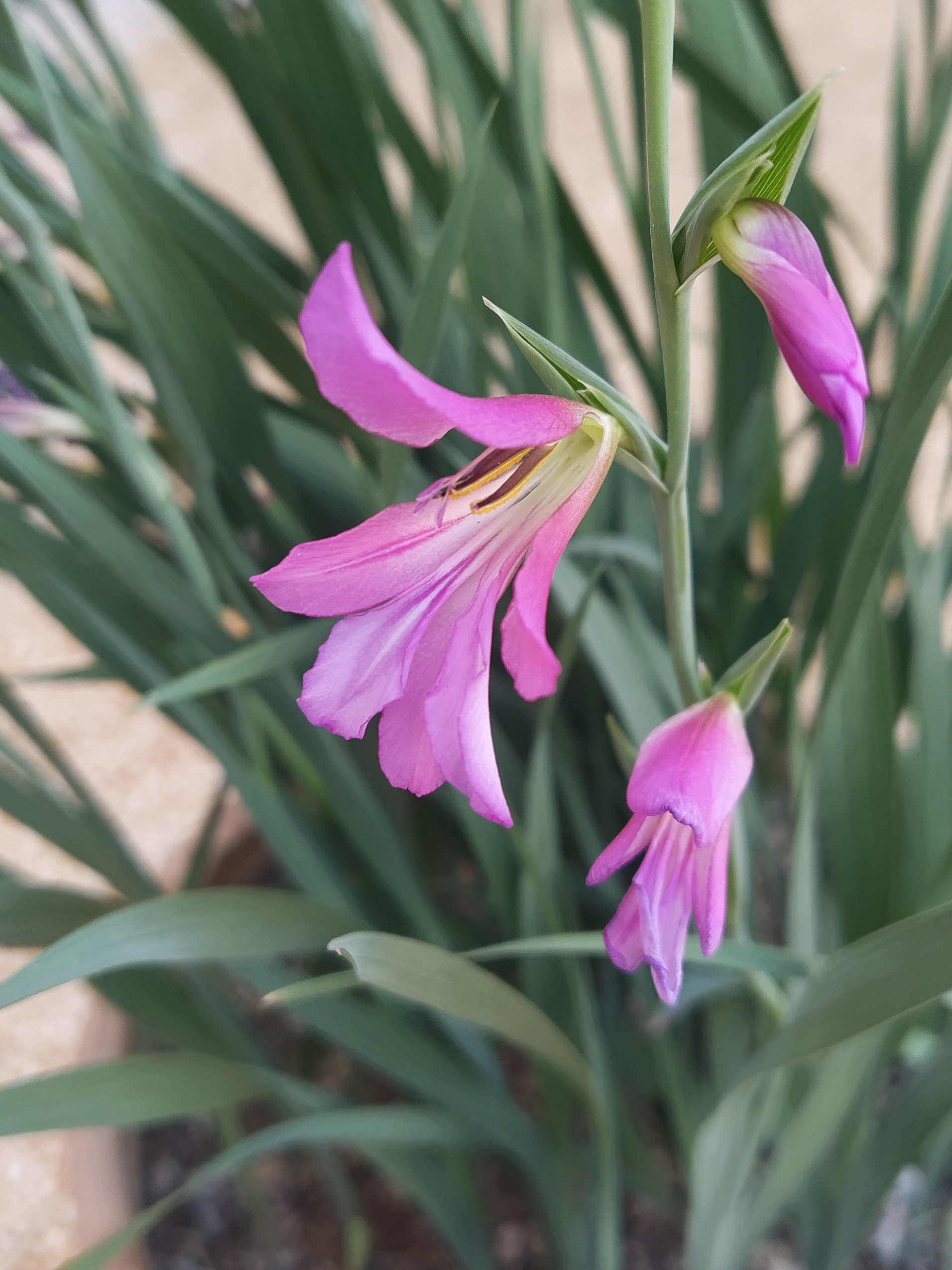
Gladiolus italicus, Behbahan, Iran

It is sometimes called the 'sword lily', but is usually called by its generic name (plural gladioli).

The genus occurs in Asia, Mediterranean Europe, South Africa, and tropical Africa. The center of diversity is in the Cape Floristic Region. The genera Acidanthera, Anomalesia, Homoglossum, and Oenostachys, formerly considered distinct, are now included in Gladiolus.

== Description ==
Gladioli grow from round, symmetrical corms (similar to crocuses) that are enveloped in several layers of brownish, fibrous tunics.

Their stems are generally unbranched, producing 1 to 9 narrow, sword-shaped, longitudinal grooved leaves, enclosed in a sheath. The lowest leaf is shortened to a cataphyll. The leaf blades can be plane or cruciform in cross section. The adaxial and abaxial surfaces of the leaf exhibit micro-striations with aligned micro-protrusions, which are coated with waxy nano-flakes. This three-level surface structure enables the leaf to shed rainfall droplets in a unidirectional manner due to anisotropic superhydrophobicity features, as reported by Mahesh C. Dubey et al.

The flowers of unmodified wild species vary from very small to perhaps 40 mm (1.6 in) across, and inflorescences bearing anything from one to several flowers. The spectacular giant flower spikes in commerce are the products of centuries of hybridisation and selection.

The flower spikes are large and one-sided, with secund, bisexual flowers, each subtended by 2 leathery, green bracts. The sepals and the petals are almost identical in appearance, and are termed tepals. They are united at their base into a tube-shaped structure. The dorsal tepal is the largest, arching over the three stamens. The outer three tepals are narrower. The perianth is funnel-shaped, with the stamens attached to its base. The style has three filiform, spoon-shaped branches, each expanding towards the apex.

The ovary is 3-locular with oblong or globose capsules, containing many winged, brown, longitudinally dehiscent seeds.

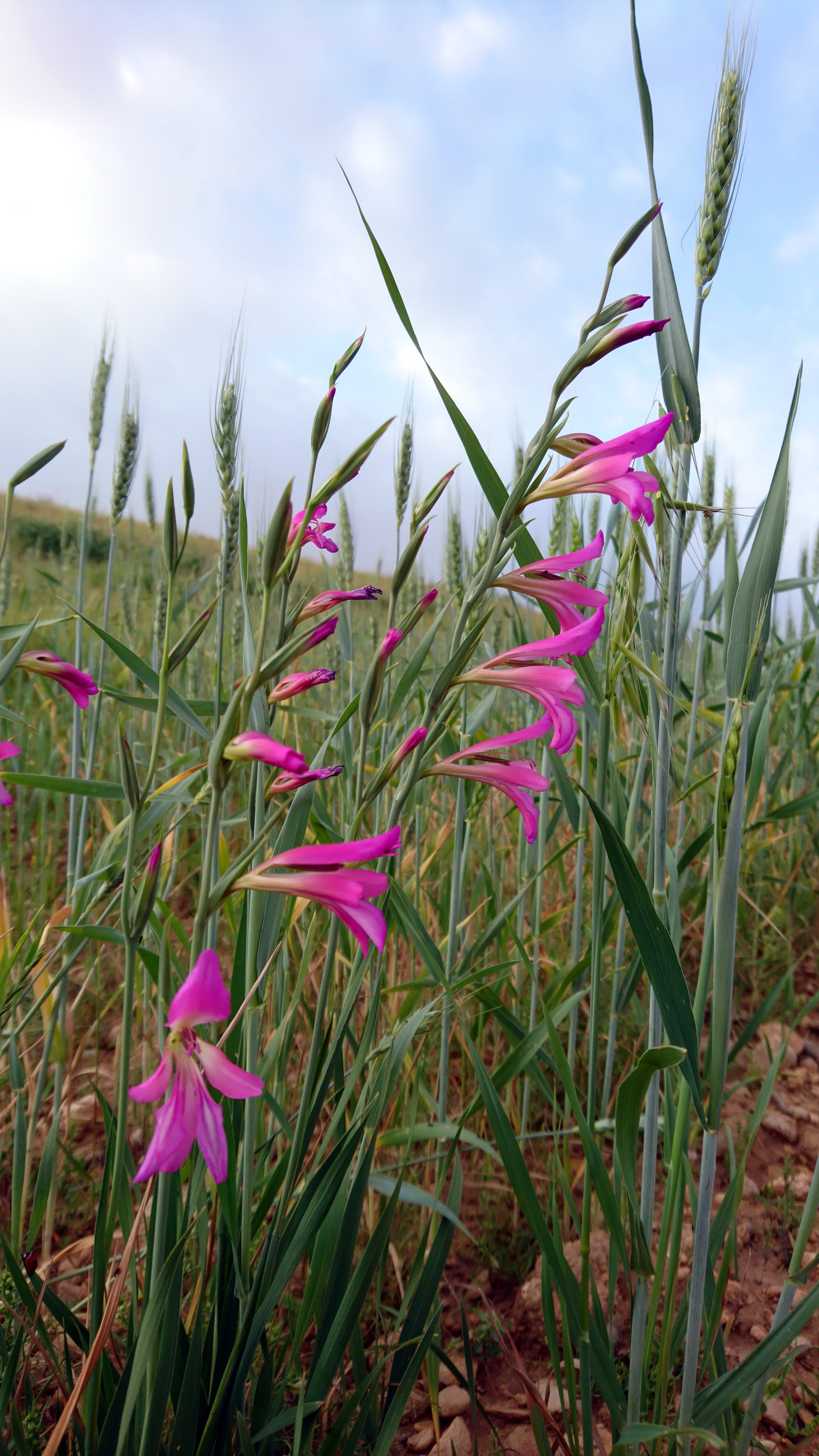
Gladiolus italicus, Behbahan, Iran

These flowers are variously coloured, ranging from pink to reddish or light purple with white, contrasting markings, or white to cream or orange to red.

== Taxonomy ==
The genus Gladiolus was first described by Carl Linnaeus in 1753 with the name attributed to Joseph Pitton de Tournefort.

=== Species ===
There are about 260 species of Gladiolus endemic to southern Africa, and about 76 in tropical Africa. About 10 species are native to Eurasia. The genus has been divided into many sections. Most species, however, are only tentatively placed.

As of August 2025, Plants of the World Online accepted almost 300 species and hybrids:

- Gladiolus abbreviatus Andrews
- Gladiolus abyssinicus (Brongn. ex Lem.) B.D.Jacks.
- Gladiolus actinomorphanthus P.A.Duvign. & Van Bockstal
- Gladiolus acuminatus F.Bolus
- Gladiolus adanus Eker & Sağıroğlu
- Gladiolus aequinoctialis Herb.
- Gladiolus aladagensis Eker & Sagiroglu
- Gladiolus alanyensis H.Duman, Sağıroğlu, Tekşen & Karaman
- Gladiolus alatus L.
- Gladiolus albens Goldblatt & J.C.Manning
- Gladiolus alucraensis Sağıroğlu & Eker
- Gladiolus amplifolius Goldblatt
- Gladiolus anatolicus (Boiss.) Stapf
- Gladiolus andringitrae Goldblatt
- Gladiolus angustus L.
- Gladiolus antakiensis A.P.Ham.
- Gladiolus antandroyi Goldblatt
- Gladiolus antholyzoides Baker
- Gladiolus appendiculatus G.J.Lewis
- Gladiolus aquamontanus Goldblatt
- Gladiolus arcuatus Klatt
- Gladiolus atropictus Goldblatt & J.C.Manning
- Gladiolus atropurpureus Baker
- Gladiolus atroviolaceus Boiss.
- Gladiolus attilae Kit Tan, B.Mathew & A.Baytop
- Gladiolus aurantiacus Klatt
- Gladiolus aureus Baker
- Gladiolus balensis Goldblatt
- Gladiolus baumii Harms
- Gladiolus bellus C.H.Wright
- Gladiolus benguellensis Baker
- Gladiolus bilineatus G.J.Lewis
- Gladiolus blommesteinii L.Bolus
- Gladiolus bojeri (Baker) Goldblatt
- Gladiolus boranensis Goldblatt
- Gladiolus brachyphyllus F.Bolus
- Gladiolus brevifolius Jacq.
- Gladiolus brevitubus G.J.Lewis
- Gladiolus buckerveldii (L.Bolus) Goldblatt
- Gladiolus bullatus Thunb. ex G.J.Lewis
- Gladiolus caeruleus Goldblatt & J.C.Manning
- Gladiolus calcaratus G.J.Lewis
- Gladiolus calcicola Goldblatt
- Gladiolus canaliculatus Goldblatt
- Gladiolus candidus (Rendle) Goldblatt
- Gladiolus cardinalis Curtis
- Gladiolus carinatus Aiton
- Gladiolus carmineus C.H.Wright
- Gladiolus carneus D.Delaroche
- Gladiolus caryophyllaceus (Burm.f.) Poir.
- Gladiolus cataractarum Oberm.
- Gladiolus caucasicus Herb.
- Gladiolus ceresianus L.Bolus
- Gladiolus chelamontanus Goldblatt
- Gladiolus chevalierianus Marais
- Gladiolus clivorum Goldblatt & J.C.Manning
- Gladiolus communis L.
- Gladiolus comptonii G.J.Lewis
- Gladiolus crassifolius Baker
- Gladiolus crispulatus L.Bolus
- Gladiolus cruentus T.Moore
- Gladiolus cunonius (L.) Gaertn.
- Gladiolus curtifolius Marais
- Gladiolus curtilimbus P.A.Duvign. & Van Bockstal ex S.Córdova
- Gladiolus cylindraceus G.J.Lewis
- Gladiolus dalenii Van Geel
- Gladiolus davisoniae F.Bolus
- Gladiolus debeerstii De Wild.
- Gladiolus debilis Sims
- Gladiolus decaryi Goldblatt
- Gladiolus decoratus Baker
- Gladiolus delpierrei Goldblatt
- Gladiolus densiflorus Baker
- Gladiolus deserticola Goldblatt
- Gladiolus dichrous (Bullock) Goldblatt
- Gladiolus diluvialis Goldblatt & J.C.Manning
- Gladiolus dolichosiphon Goldblatt & J.C.Manning
- Gladiolus dolomiticus Oberm.
- Gladiolus dubius Guss.
- Gladiolus dzavakheticus Eristavi
- Gladiolus ecklonii Lehm.
- Gladiolus elliotii Baker
- Gladiolus emiliae L.Bolus
- Gladiolus engysiphon G.J.Lewis
- Gladiolus equitans Thunb.
- Gladiolus erectiflorus Baker
- Gladiolus exalatus Goldblatt & Blittersd.
- Gladiolus exiguus G.J.Lewis
- Gladiolus exilis G.J.Lewis
- Gladiolus fenestratus Goldblatt
- Gladiolus ferrugineus Goldblatt & J.C.Manning
- Gladiolus filiformis Goldblatt & J.C.Manning
- Gladiolus flanaganii Baker
- Gladiolus flavoviridis Goldblatt
- Gladiolus floribundus Jacq.
- Gladiolus fourcadei (L.Bolus) Goldblatt & M.P.de Vos
- Gladiolus gallaecicus Pau ex J.-M.Tison & Girod
- Gladiolus geardii L.Bolus
- Gladiolus goldblattianus Geerinck
- Gladiolus gracilis Jacq.
- Gladiolus gracillimus Baker
- Gladiolus grandiflorus Andrews
- Gladiolus grantii Baker
- Gladiolus gregarius Welw. ex Baker
- Gladiolus griseus Goldblatt & J.C.Manning
- Gladiolus gueinzii Kunze
- Gladiolus gunnisii (Rendle) Marais
- Gladiolus guthriei F.Bolus
- Gladiolus hajastanicus Gabrieljan
- Gladiolus halophilus Boiss. & Heldr.
- Gladiolus hamzaoglui H.Duman, Sagiroglu & Teksen
- Gladiolus harmsianus Vaupel
- Gladiolus hirsutus Jacq.
- Gladiolus hollandii L.Bolus
- Gladiolus horombensis Goldblatt
- Gladiolus huillensis (Welw. ex Baker) Goldblatt
- Gladiolus humilis Stapf
- Gladiolus huttonii (N.E.Br.) Goldblatt & M.P.de Vos
- Gladiolus hyalinus Jacq.
- Gladiolus illyricus W.D.J.Koch
- Gladiolus imbricatus L.
- Gladiolus inandensis Baker
- Gladiolus inarimensis Guss.
- Gladiolus inflatus (Thunb.) Thunb.
- Gladiolus inflexus Goldblatt & J.C.Manning
- Gladiolus insolens Goldblatt & J.C.Manning
- Gladiolus intonsus Goldblatt
- Gladiolus involutus D.Delaroche
- Gladiolus iroensis (A.Chev.) Marais
- Gladiolus italicus Mill.
- Gladiolus izzet-baysalii Eker & Sagiroglu
- Gladiolus jonquilodorus Eckl. ex G.J.Lewis
- Gladiolus juncifolius Goldblatt
- Gladiolus kamiesbergensis G.J.Lewis
- Gladiolus karooicus Goldblatt & J.C.Manning
- Gladiolus kotschyanus Boiss.
- Gladiolus lapeirousioides Goldblatt
- Gladiolus laxiflorus Baker
- Gladiolus ledoctei P.A.Duvign. & Van Bockstal
- Gladiolus leonensis Marais
- Gladiolus leptosiphon F.Bolus
- Gladiolus liliaceus Houtt.
- Gladiolus linearifolius Vaupel
- Gladiolus lithicola Goldblatt
- Gladiolus longicollis Baker
- Gladiolus longispathaceus Cufod.
- Gladiolus loteniensis Hilliard & B.L.Burtt
- Gladiolus lundaensis Goldblatt
- Gladiolus luteus Lam.
- Gladiolus macneilii Oberm.
- Gladiolus maculatus Sweet
- Gladiolus magnificus (Harms) Goldblatt
- Gladiolus malvinus Goldblatt & J.C.Manning
- Gladiolus manikaensis Goldblatt
- Gladiolus mariae Burgt
- Gladiolus marlothii G.J.Lewis
- Gladiolus martleyi L.Bolus
- Gladiolus meliusculus (G.J.Lewis) Goldblatt & J.C.Manning
- Gladiolus melleri Baker
- Gladiolus menitskyi Gabrieljan
- Gladiolus mensensis (Schweinf.) Goldblatt
- Gladiolus merianellus (L.) Thunb.
- Gladiolus meridionalis G.J.Lewis
- Gladiolus metallicola Goldblatt
- Gladiolus micranthus Stapf
- Gladiolus microcarpus G.J.Lewis
- Gladiolus microspicatus P.A.Duvign. & Van Bockstal ex S.Córdova
- Gladiolus miniatus Eckl.
- Gladiolus mirus Vaupel
- Gladiolus monticola G.J.Lewis ex Goldblatt & J.C.Manning
- Gladiolus mortonius Herb.
- Gladiolus mosambicensis Baker
- Gladiolus mostertiae L.Bolus
- Gladiolus muenzneri Vaupel
- Gladiolus murgusicus Mikheev
- Gladiolus murielae Kelway
- Gladiolus mutabilis G.J.Lewis
- Gladiolus negeliensis Goldblatt
- Gladiolus nerineoides G.J.Lewis
- Gladiolus nigromontanus Goldblatt
- Gladiolus numidicus Jord.
- Gladiolus nyasicus Goldblatt
- Gladiolus oatesii Rolfe
- Gladiolus ochroleucus Baker
- Gladiolus oliganthus Baker
- Gladiolus oligophlebius Baker
- Gladiolus oppositiflorus Herb.
- Gladiolus orchidiflorus Andrews
- Gladiolus oreocharis Schltr.
- Gladiolus oreophilus Eker & Sağıroğlu
- Gladiolus ornatus Klatt
- Gladiolus osmaniyensis Sagiroglu
- Gladiolus overbergensis Goldblatt & M.P.de Vos
- Gladiolus paludosus Baker
- Gladiolus palustris Gaudin
- Gladiolus papilio Hook.f.
- Gladiolus pappei Baker
- Gladiolus pardalinus Goldblatt & J.C.Manning
- Gladiolus parvulus Schltr.
- Gladiolus patersoniae F.Bolus
- Gladiolus pauciflorus Baker ex Oliv.
- Gladiolus pavonia Goldblatt & J.C.Manning
- Gladiolus permeabilis D.Delaroche
- Gladiolus perrieri Goldblatt
- Gladiolus persicus Boiss.
- Gladiolus phoenix Goldblatt & J.C.Manning
- Gladiolus pole-evansii I.Verd.
- Gladiolus praecostatus Marais
- Gladiolus pretoriensis Kuntze
- Gladiolus priorii (N.E.Br.) Goldblatt & M.P.de Vos
- Gladiolus pritzelii Diels
- Gladiolus puberulus Vaupel
- Gladiolus pubigerus G.J.Lewis
- Gladiolus pulcherrimus (G.J.Lewis) Goldblatt & J.C.Manning
- Gladiolus pungens P.A.Duvign. & Van Bockstal ex S.Córdova
- Gladiolus pusillus Goldblatt
- Gladiolus quadrangularis (Burm.f.) Ker Gawl.
- Gladiolus quadrangulus (D.Delaroche) Barnard
- Gladiolus recurvus L.
- Gladiolus reginae Goldblatt & J.C.Manning
- Gladiolus rehmannii Baker
- Gladiolus rhodanthus J.C.Manning & Goldblatt
- Gladiolus richardsiae Goldblatt
- Gladiolus robertsoniae F.Bolus
- Gladiolus robiliartianus P.A.Duvign.
- Gladiolus rogersii Baker
- Gladiolus roseolus Chiov.
- Gladiolus roseovenosus Goldblatt & J.C.Manning
- Gladiolus rubellus Goldblatt
- Gladiolus rudis Licht. ex Roem. & Schult.
- Gladiolus rufomarginatus G.J.Lewis
- Gladiolus rupicola Vaupel
- Gladiolus saccatus (Klatt) Goldblatt & M.P.de Vos
- Gladiolus salmoneicolor P.A.Duvign. & Van Bockstal ex S.Córdova
- Gladiolus salteri G.J.Lewis
- Gladiolus saundersii Hook.f.
- Gladiolus saxatilis Goldblatt & J.C.Manning
- Gladiolus scabridus Goldblatt & J.C.Manning
- Gladiolus schweinfurthii (Baker) Goldblatt & M.P.de Vos
- Gladiolus scullyi Baker
- Gladiolus sekukuniensis P.J.D.Winter
- Gladiolus sempervirens G.J.Lewis
- Gladiolus serapiiflorus Goldblatt
- Gladiolus serenjensis Goldblatt
- Gladiolus sericeovillosus Hook.f.
- Gladiolus serpenticola Goldblatt & J.C.Manning
- Gladiolus siirtensis Pınar, Eroğlu & Fidan
- Gladiolus somalensis Goldblatt & Thulin
- Gladiolus speciosus Thunb.
- Gladiolus splendens (Sweet) Herb.
- Gladiolus stefaniae Oberm.
- Gladiolus stellatus G.J.Lewis
- Gladiolus stenolobus Goldblatt
- Gladiolus stenosiphon Goldblatt
- Gladiolus stokoei G.J.Lewis
- Gladiolus subcaeruleus G.J.Lewis
- Gladiolus sudanicus Goldblatt
- Gladiolus sufflavus (G.J.Lewis) Goldblatt & J.C.Manning
- Gladiolus sulculatus Goldblatt
- Gladiolus symonsii F.Bolus
- Gladiolus szovitsii Grossh.
- Gladiolus taubertianus Schltr.
- Gladiolus tenuis M.Bieb.
- Gladiolus teretifolius Goldblatt & M.P.de Vos
- Gladiolus trichonemifolius Ker Gawl.
- Gladiolus triphyllus (Sm.) Ker Gawl.
- Gladiolus tristis L.
- Gladiolus tshombeanus P.A.Duvign. & Van Bockstal
- Gladiolus uitenhagensis Goldblatt & Vlok
- Gladiolus undulatus L.
- Gladiolus unguiculatus Baker
- Gladiolus usambarensis Marais ex Goldblatt
- Gladiolus uysiae L.Bolus ex G.J.Lewis
- Gladiolus vaginatus F.Bolus
- Gladiolus vandermerwei (L.Bolus) Goldblatt & M.P.de Vos
- Gladiolus variegatus (G.J.Lewis) Goldblatt & J.C.Manning
- Gladiolus varius F.Bolus
- Gladiolus velutinus De Wild.
- Gladiolus venustus G.J.Lewis
- Gladiolus verdickii De Wild. & T.Durand
- Gladiolus vernus Oberm.
- Gladiolus vexillare Martelli
- Gladiolus vigilans Barnard
- Gladiolus vinosomaculatus Kies
- Gladiolus violaceolineatus G.J.Lewis
- Gladiolus virescens Thunb.
- Gladiolus virgatus Goldblatt & J.C.Manning
- Gladiolus virgineus Goldblatt & J.C.Manning
- Gladiolus viridiflorus G.J.Lewis
- Gladiolus watermeyeri L.Bolus
- Gladiolus watsonioides Baker
- Gladiolus watsonius Thunb.
- Gladiolus wilsonii (Baker) Goldblatt & J.C.Manning
- Gladiolus woodii Baker
- Gladiolus zambesiacus Baker
- Gladiolus zimbabweensis Goldblatt

Natural and artificial hybrids include:

- Gladiolus × byzantinus Mill.
- Gladiolus × colvillii (G. cardinalis × G. tristis)
- Gladiolus × gandavensis (G. dalenii × G. oppositiflorus)
- Gladiolus × lewisiae Oberm.
- Gladiolus × sulistrovicus Kaminski, Szczep. & Cieslak

== Ecology ==
The South African species were originally pollinated by long-tongued anthophorini bees, but some changes in the pollination system have occurred, allowing pollination by sunbirds, noctuid and hawk-moths, long-tongued flies and several others. In the temperate zones of Europe many of the hybrid large flowering sorts of gladiolus can be pollinated by small well-known wasps. Actually, they are not very good pollinators because of the large flowers of the plants and the small size of the wasps. Another insect in this zone which can try some of the nectar of the gladioli is the best-known European Hawk-moth Macroglossum stellatarum which usually pollinates many popular garden flowers like Petunia, Zinnia, Dianthus and others.

Gladioli are used as food plants by the larvae of some Lepidoptera species including the large yellow underwing, and gladiolus thrips.

== Horticulture ==
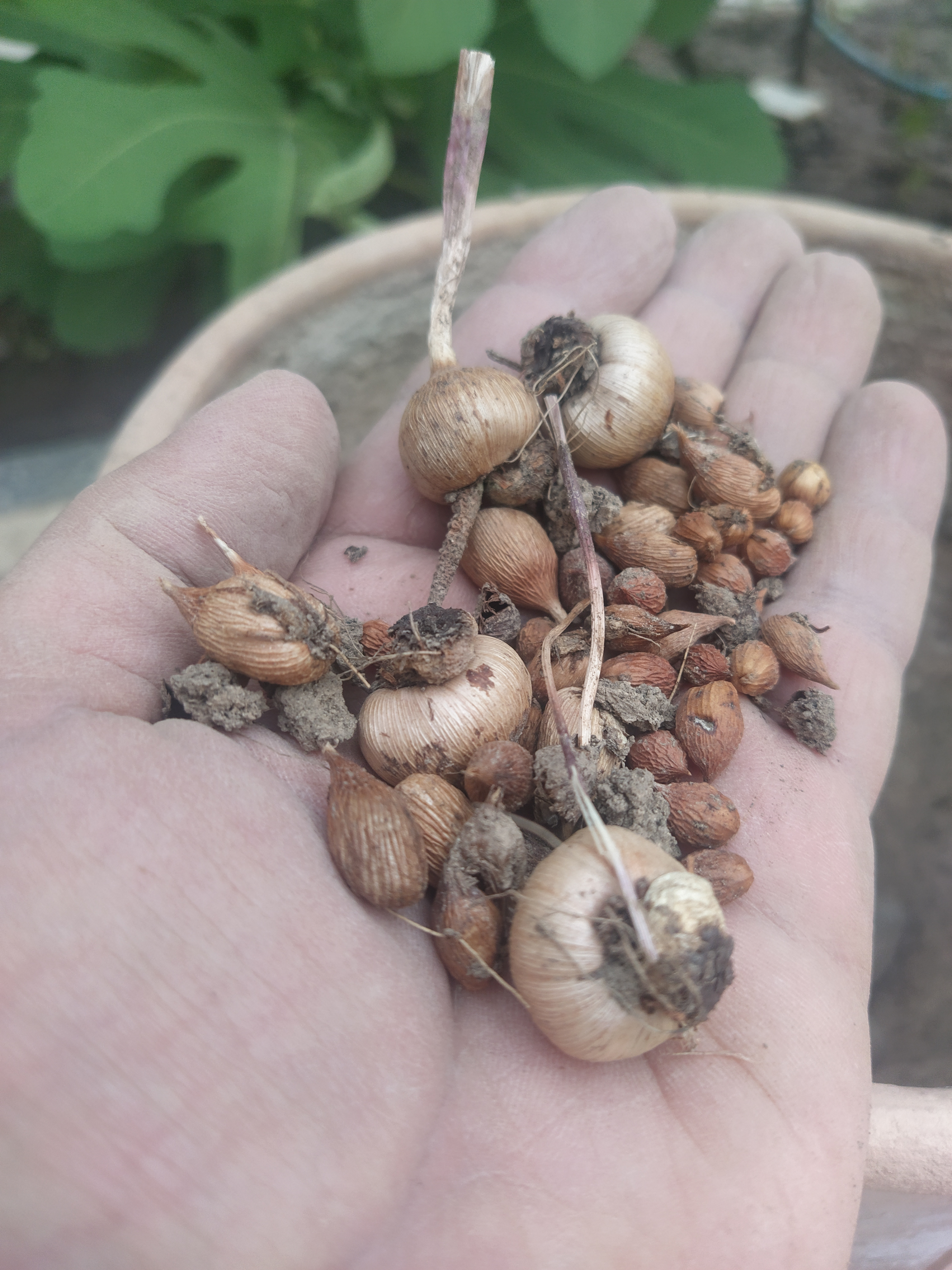
Wild Gladiolus italicus corms of different ages and sizes (from Behbahan)

Gladioli have been extensively hybridized and a wide range of ornamental flower colours are available from the many varieties. The main hybrid groups have been obtained by crossing between four or five species, followed by selection: 'Grandiflorus', 'Primulines' and 'Nanus'. They can make very good cut flowers for display.

The majority of the species in this genus are diploid with 30 chromosomes (2n=30) but the Grandiflora hybrids are tetraploid and possess 60 chromosomes (2n=4x=60). This is because the main parental species of these hybrids is Gladiolus dalenii which is also tetraploid and includes a wide range of varieties (like the Grandiflora hybrids).

Numerous garden cultivars have been developed, of which 'Robinetta' (a G. recurvus hybrid), with pink flowers, has gained the Royal Horticultural Society's Award of Garden Merit.

== Gallery ==
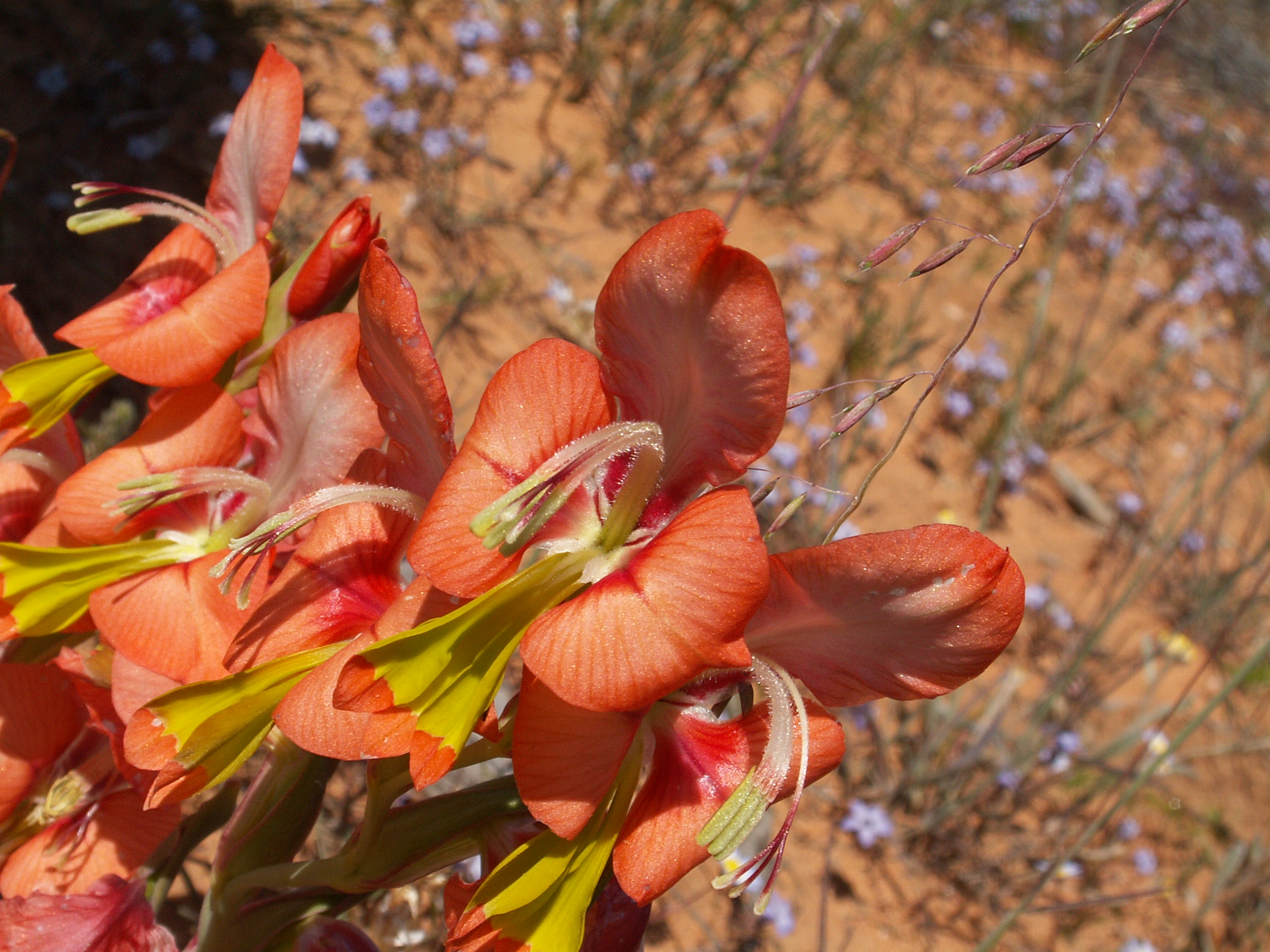
Gladiolus alatus, Clanwilliam, RSA

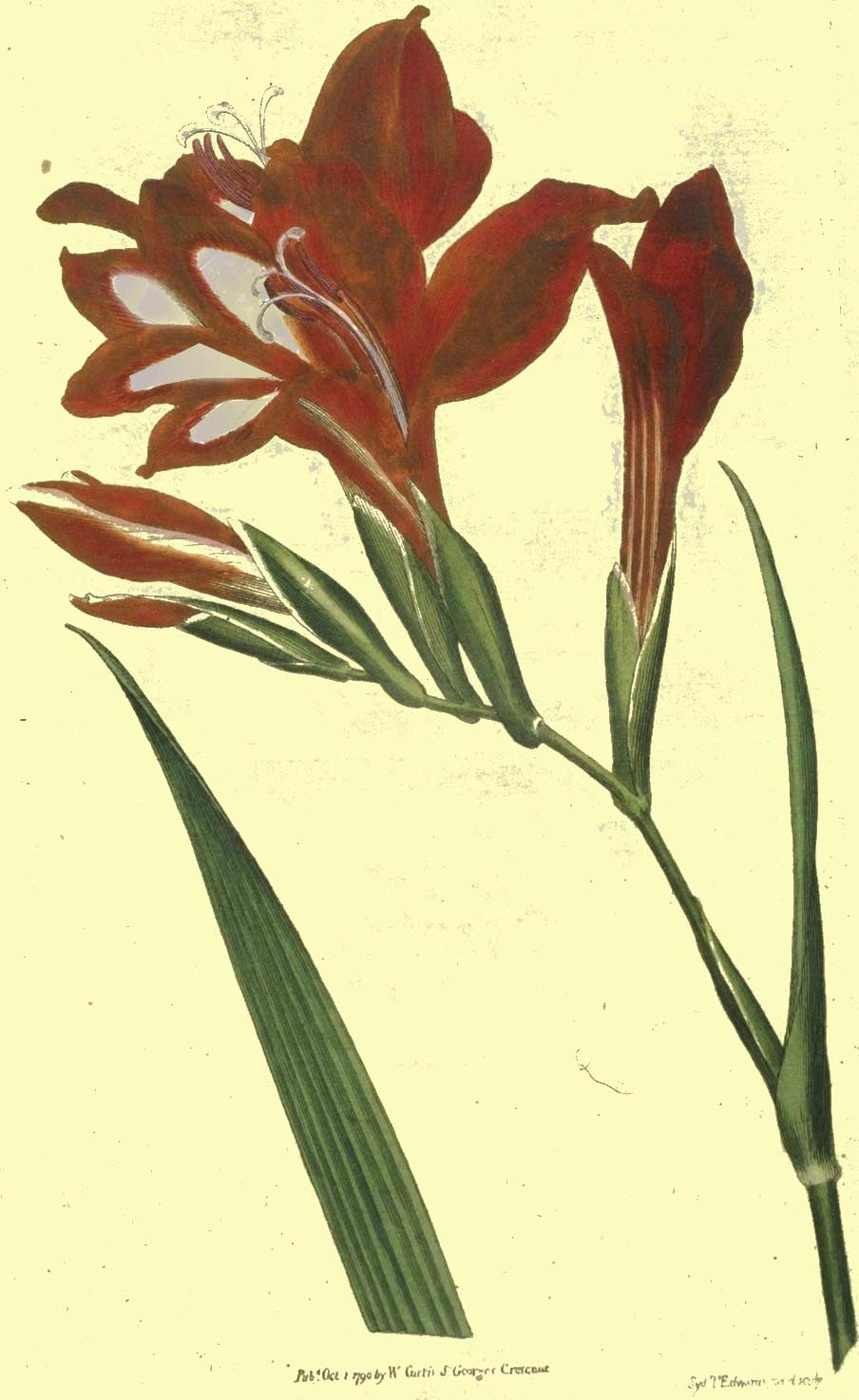
Gladiolus cardinalis
from Curtis's Botanical Magazine 1790

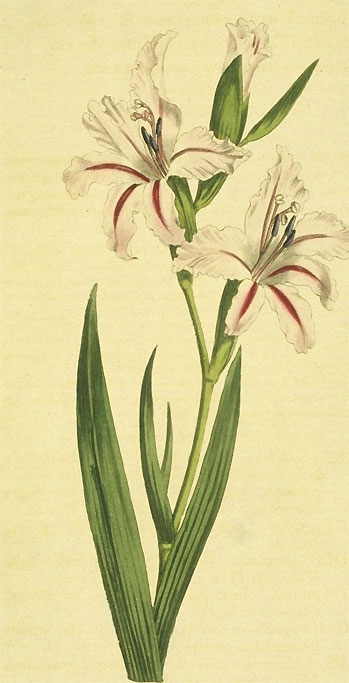
Waved-flowered Gladiolus (Gladiolus undulatus)
from Curtis's Botanical Magazine 1801

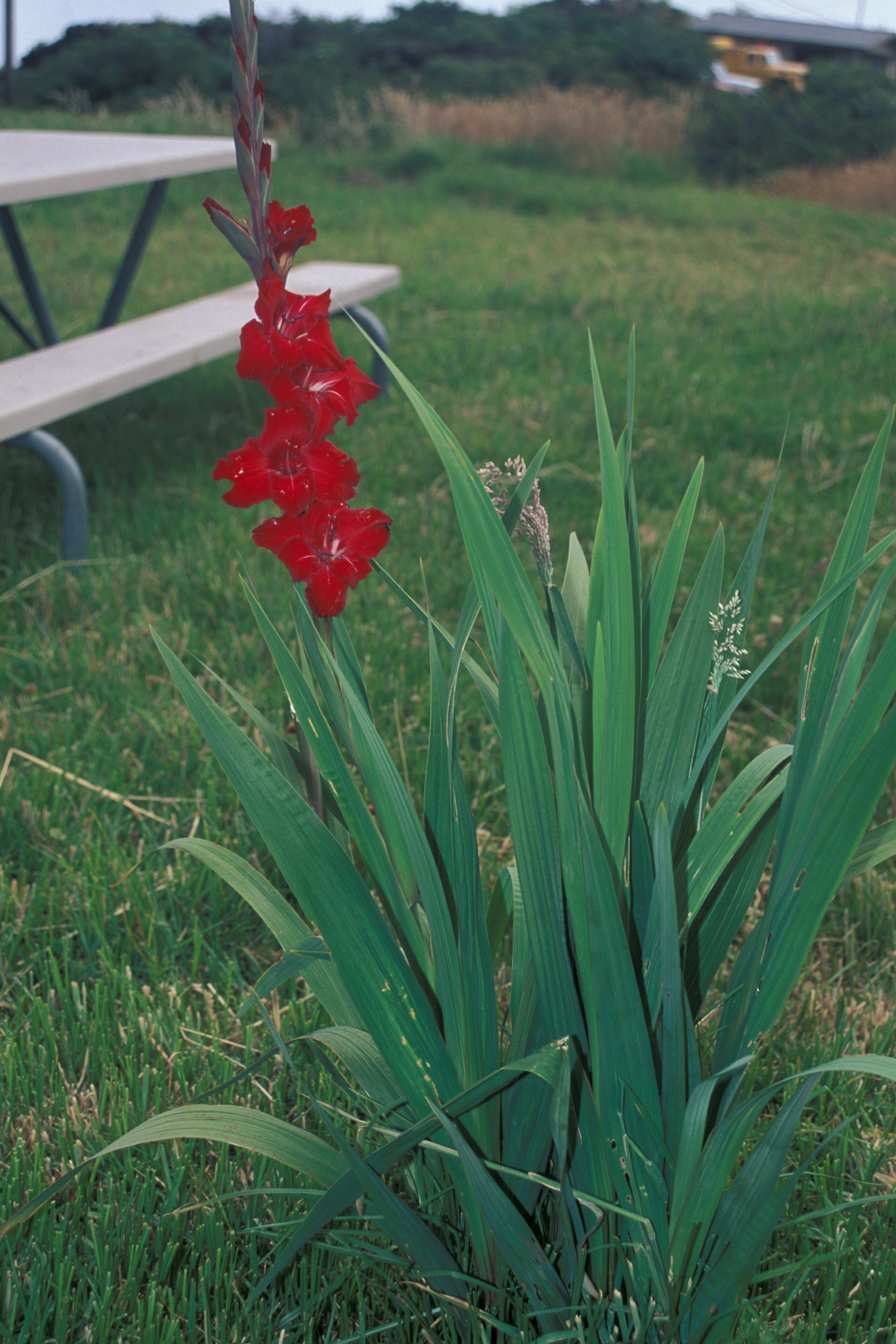
Gladiolus hybrid, Grandiflorus group

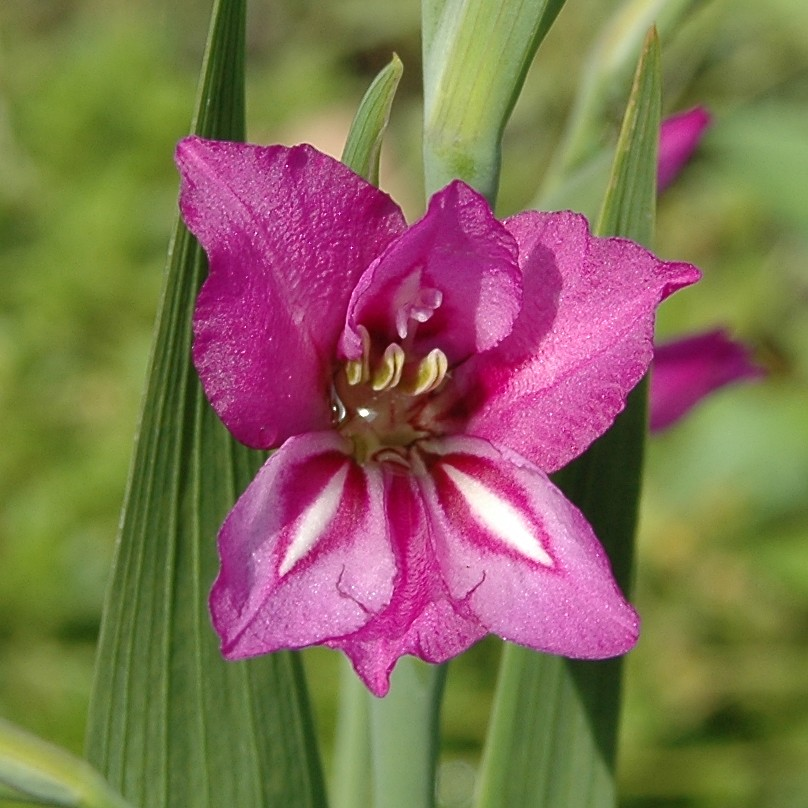
Gladiolus imbricatus

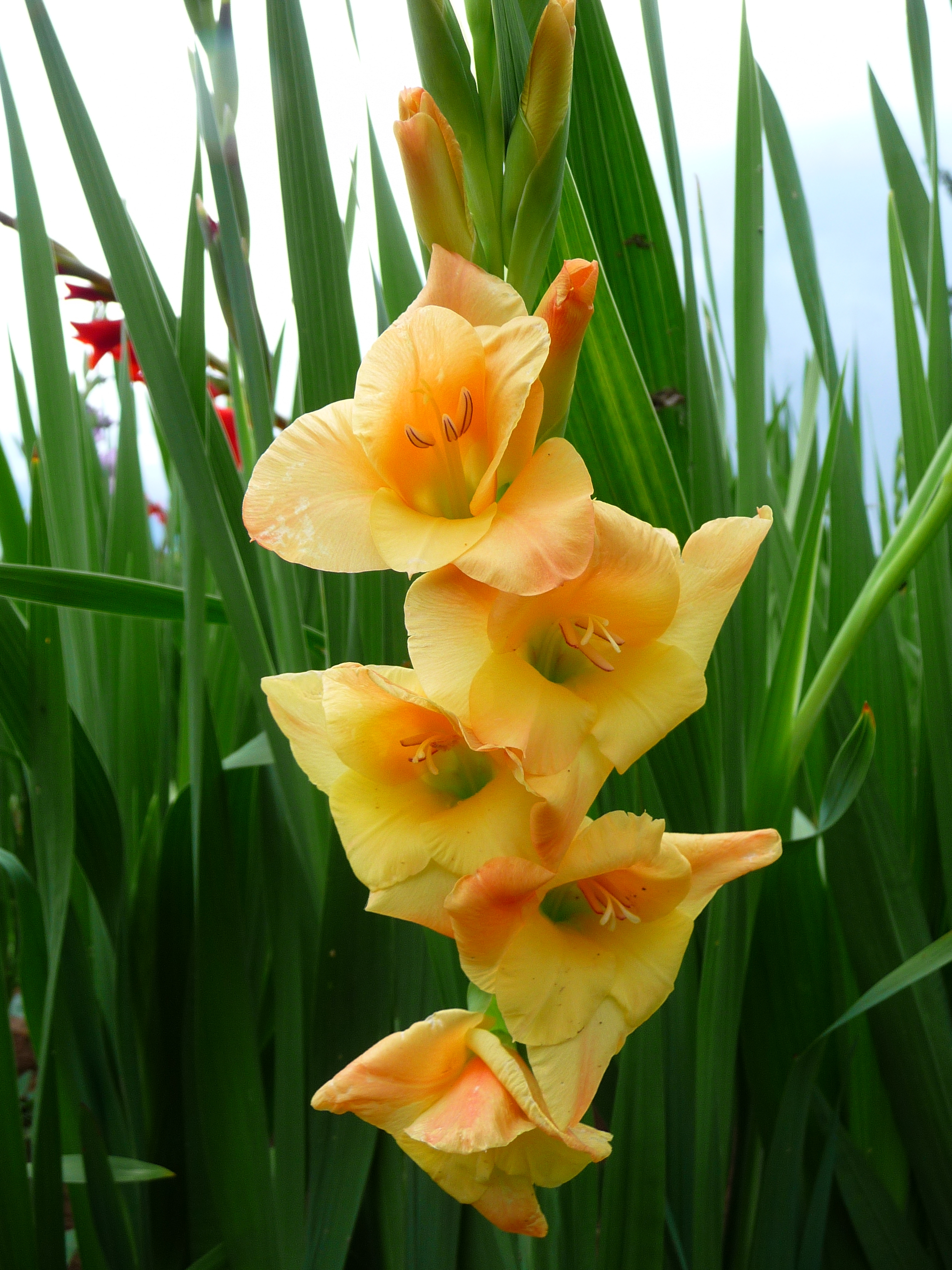
Gladiolus × hortulanus

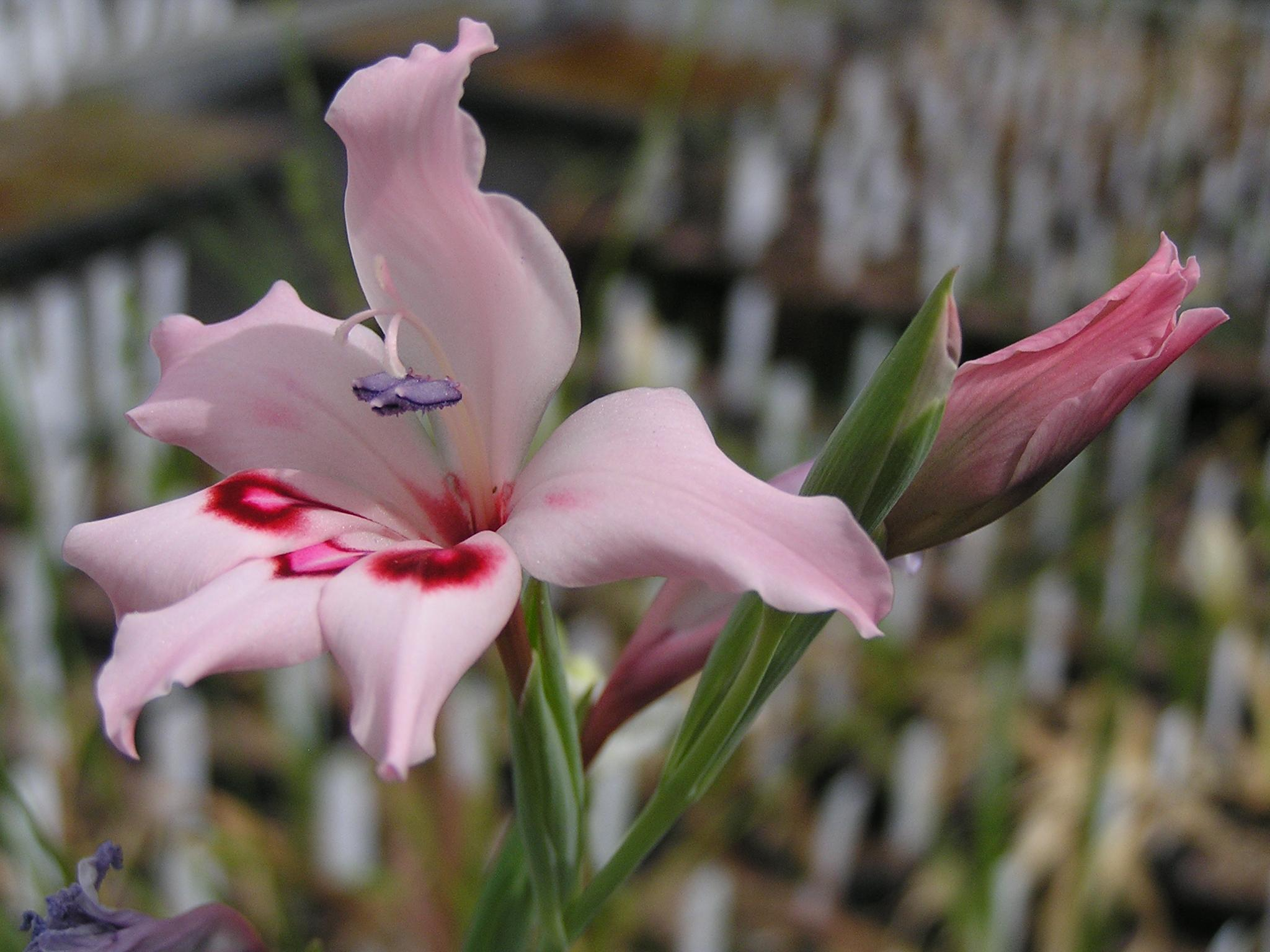
Gladiolus carneus

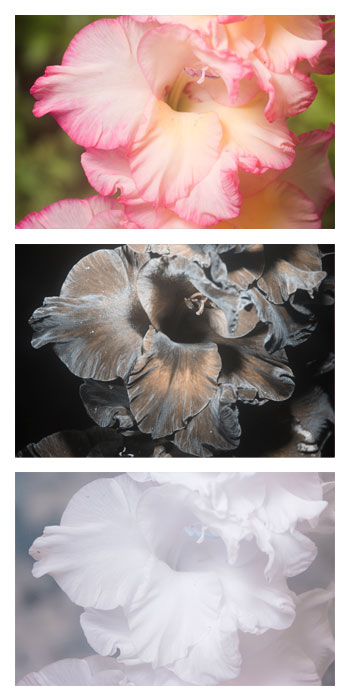
Gladiolus × hortulanus 'Priscilla' photographed in visible, ultraviolet (showing nectar guides), and infrared light

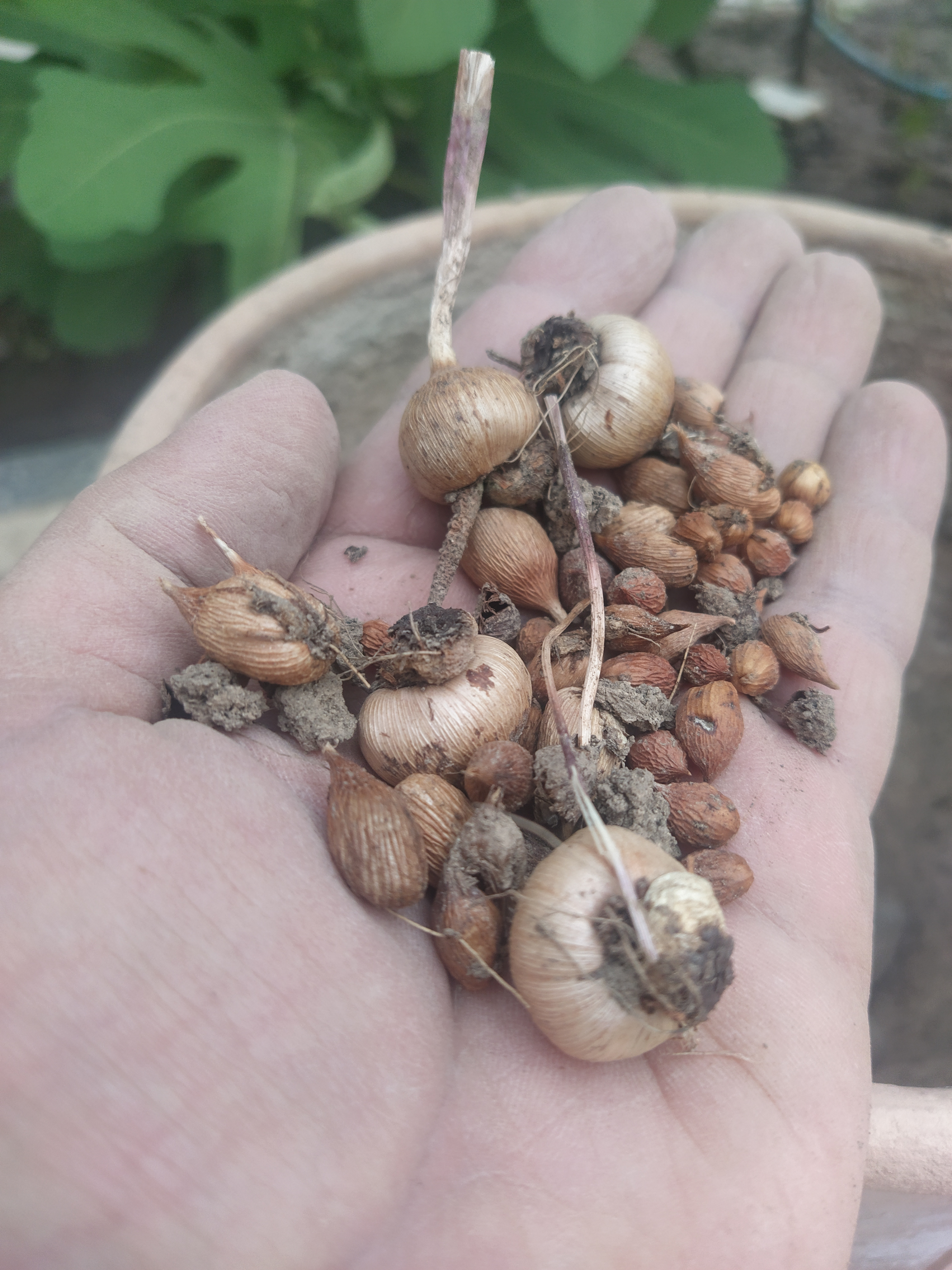
Gladiolus italicus bulbs of different sizes and ages (from Behbahan, Iran)

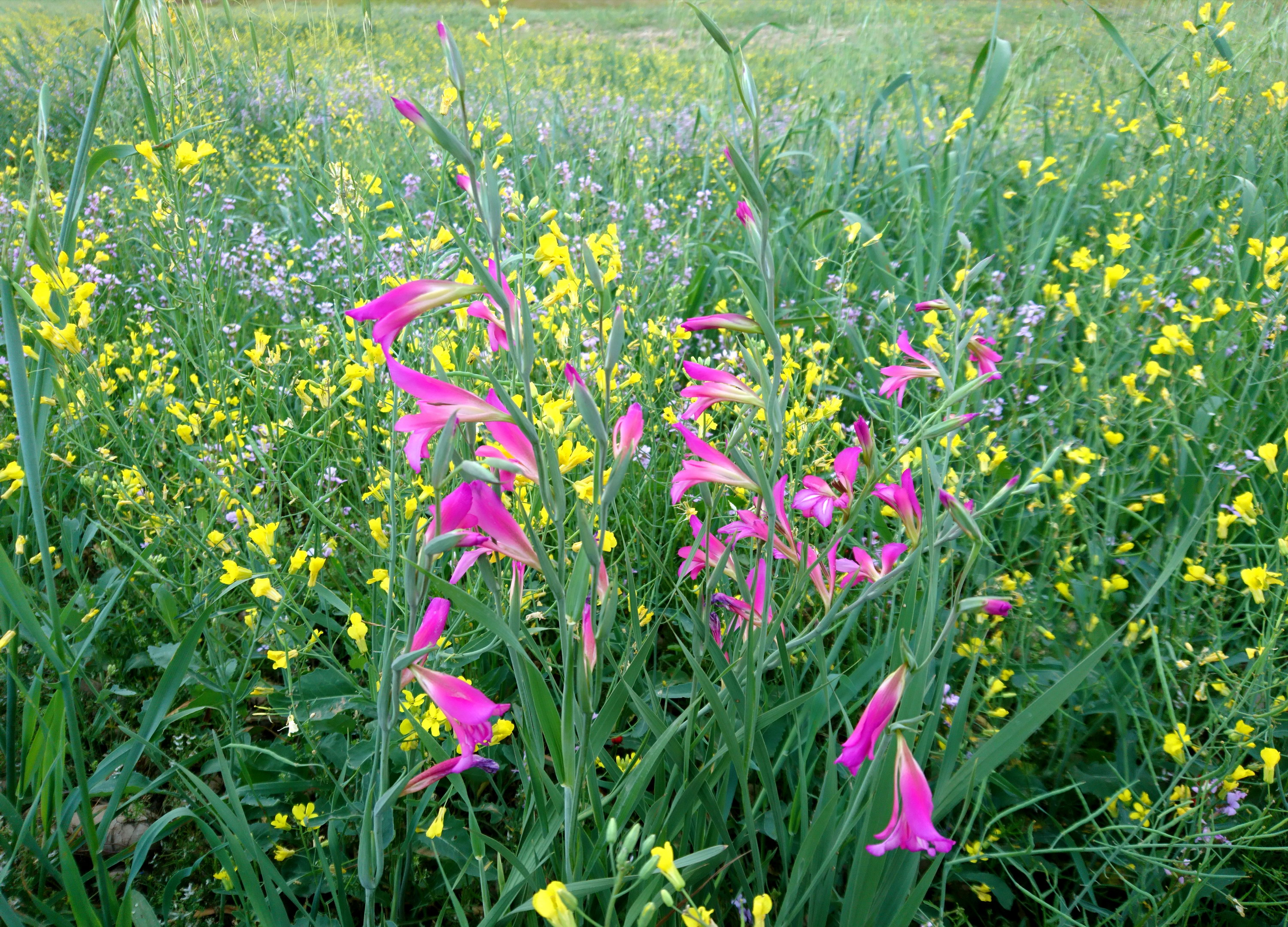
Wild Gladiolus italicus in Behbahan

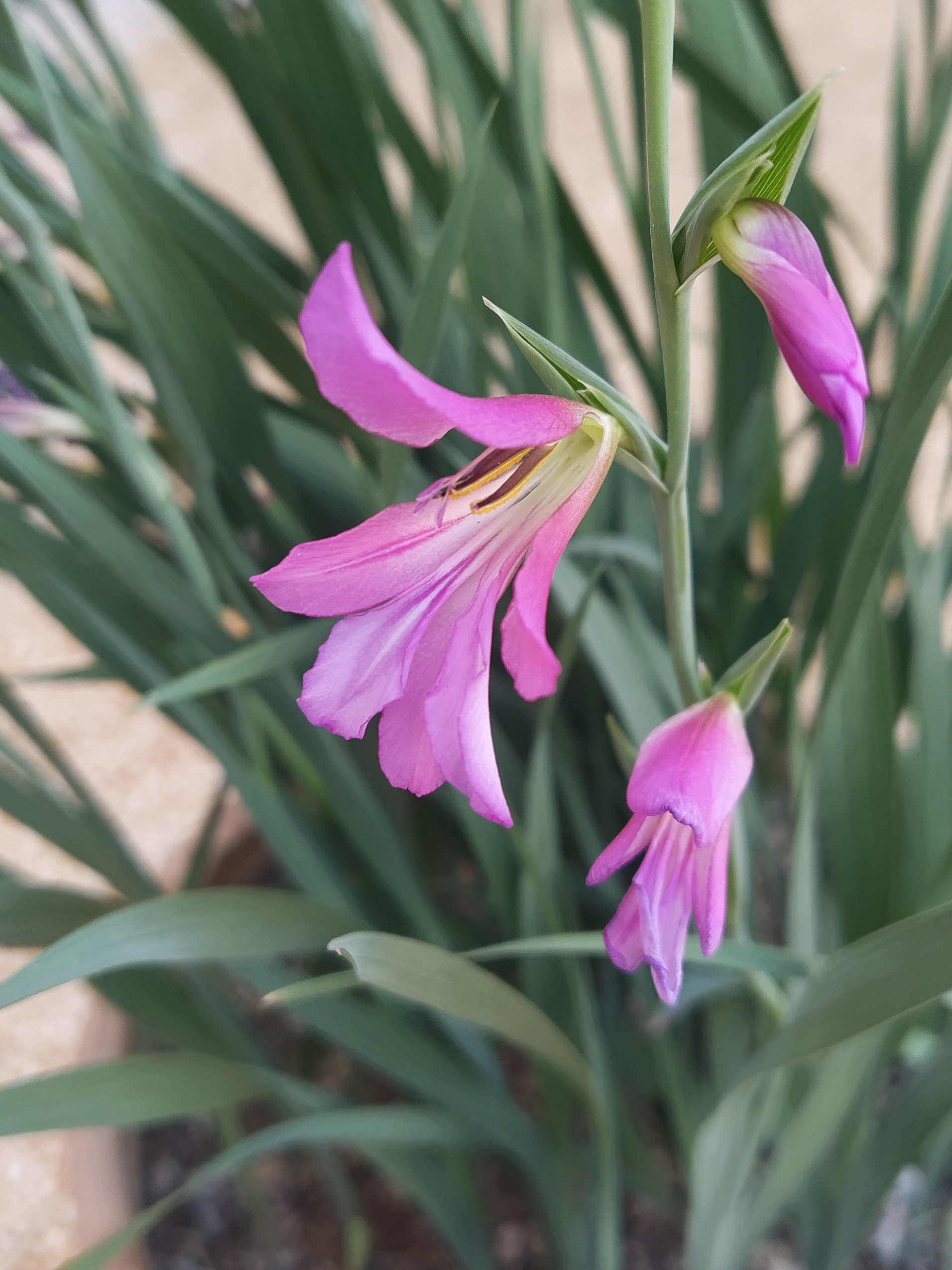
Gladiolus italicus in Behbahan

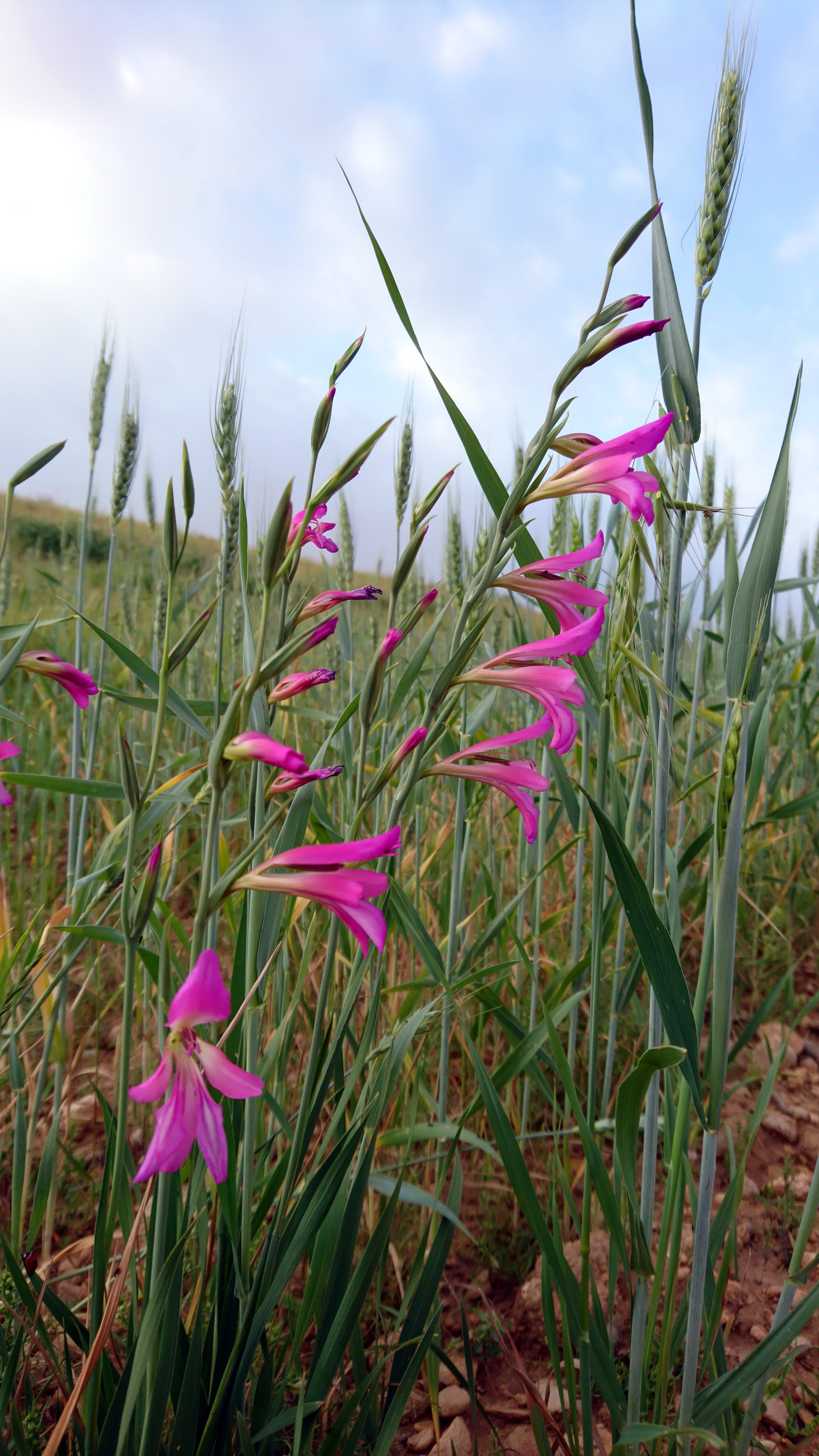
Wild Gladiolus italicus

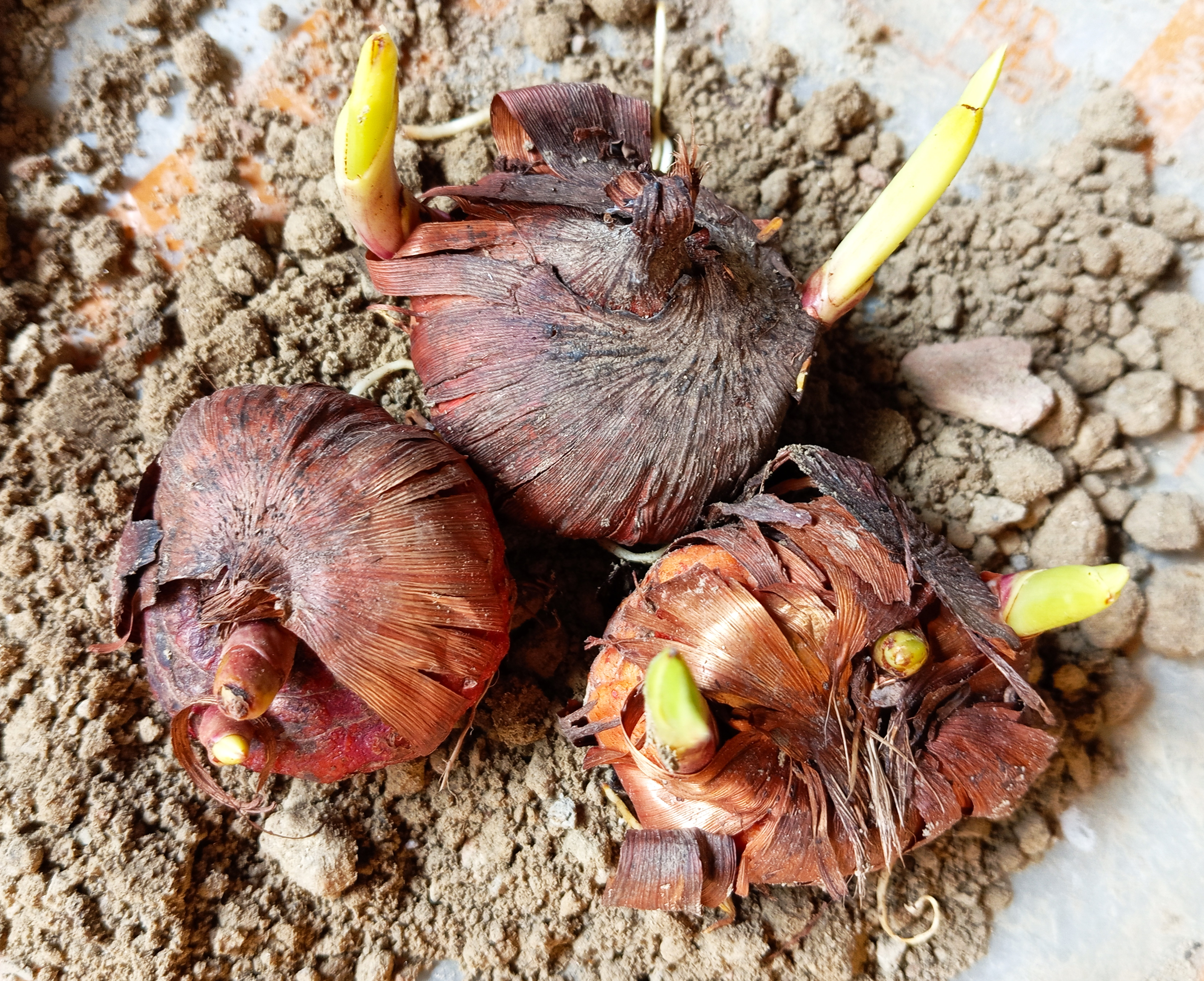
Gladiolus corms, Kolkata, West Bengal, India

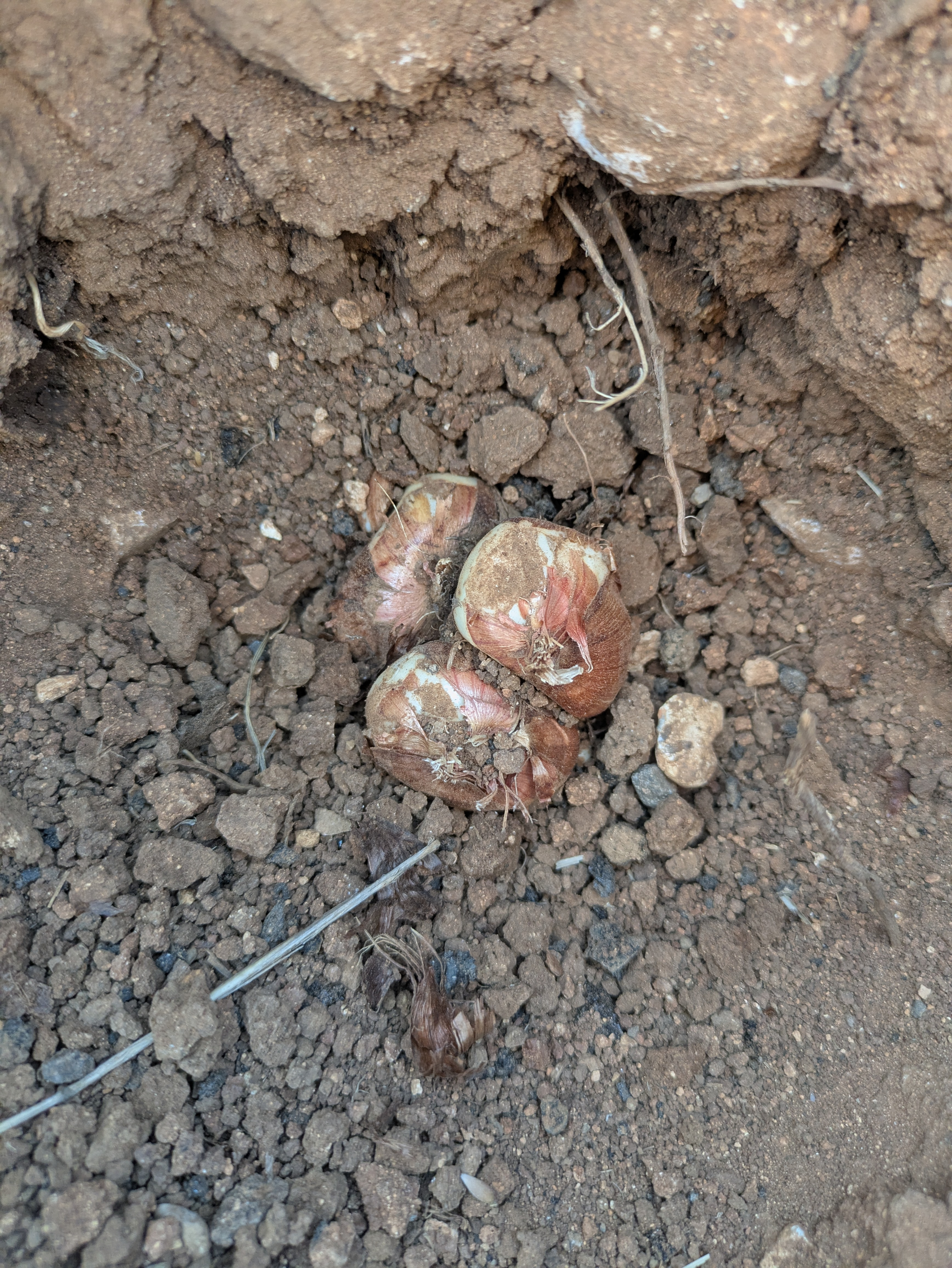
Gladiolus italicus corms, Behbahan

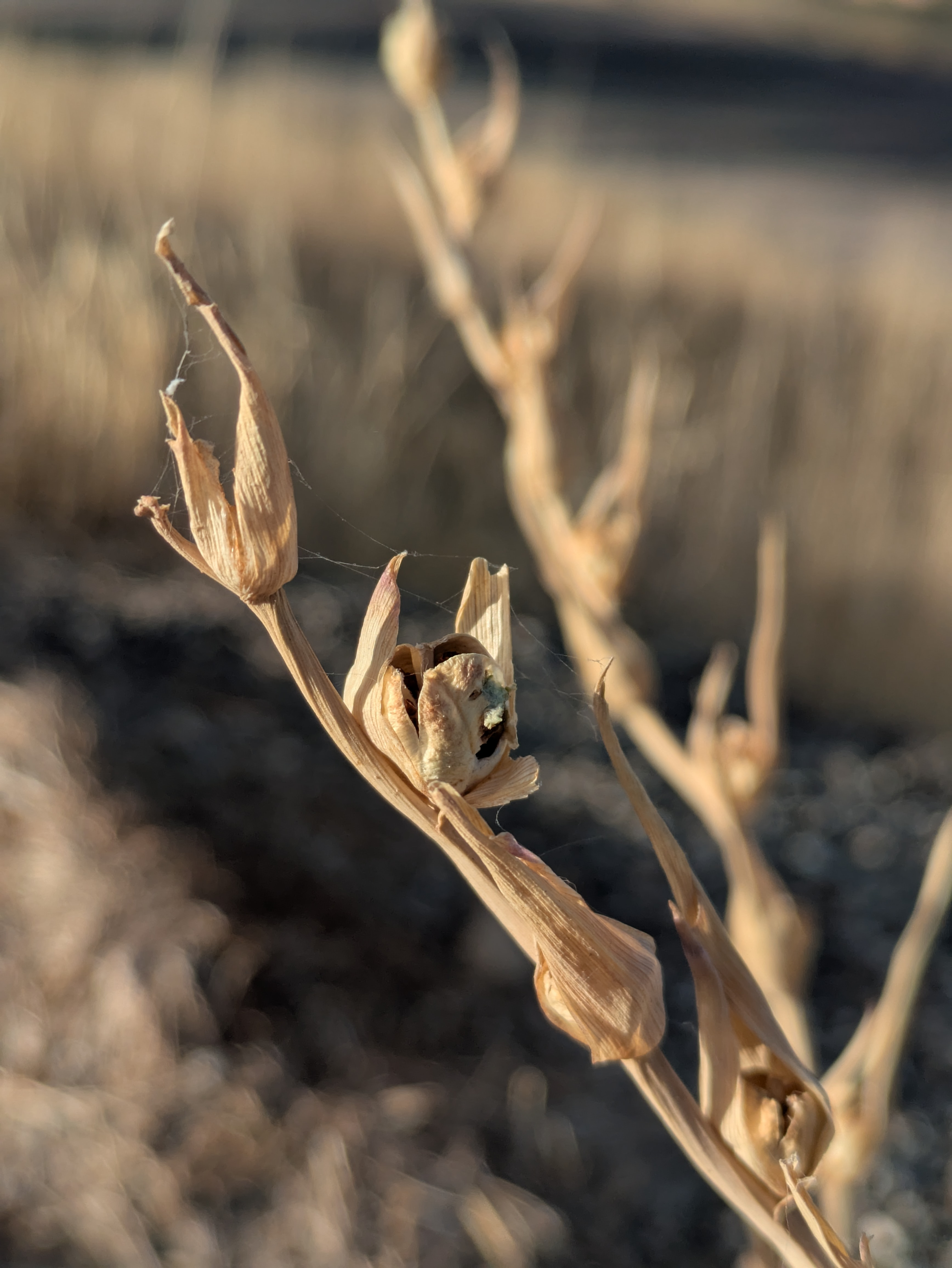
Gladiolus italicus seed capsules, Behbahan

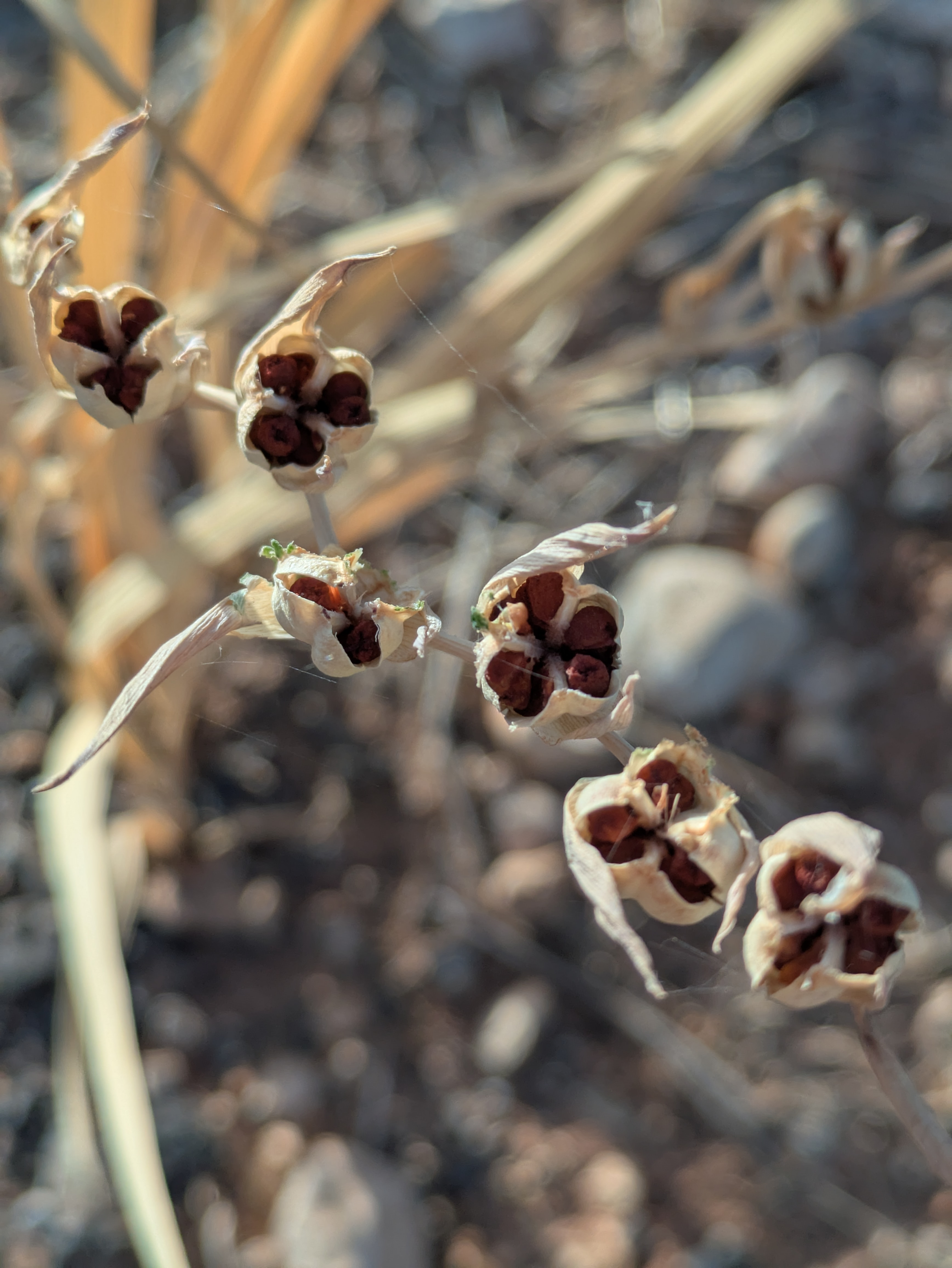
Seeds of Gladiolus italicus, Behbahan

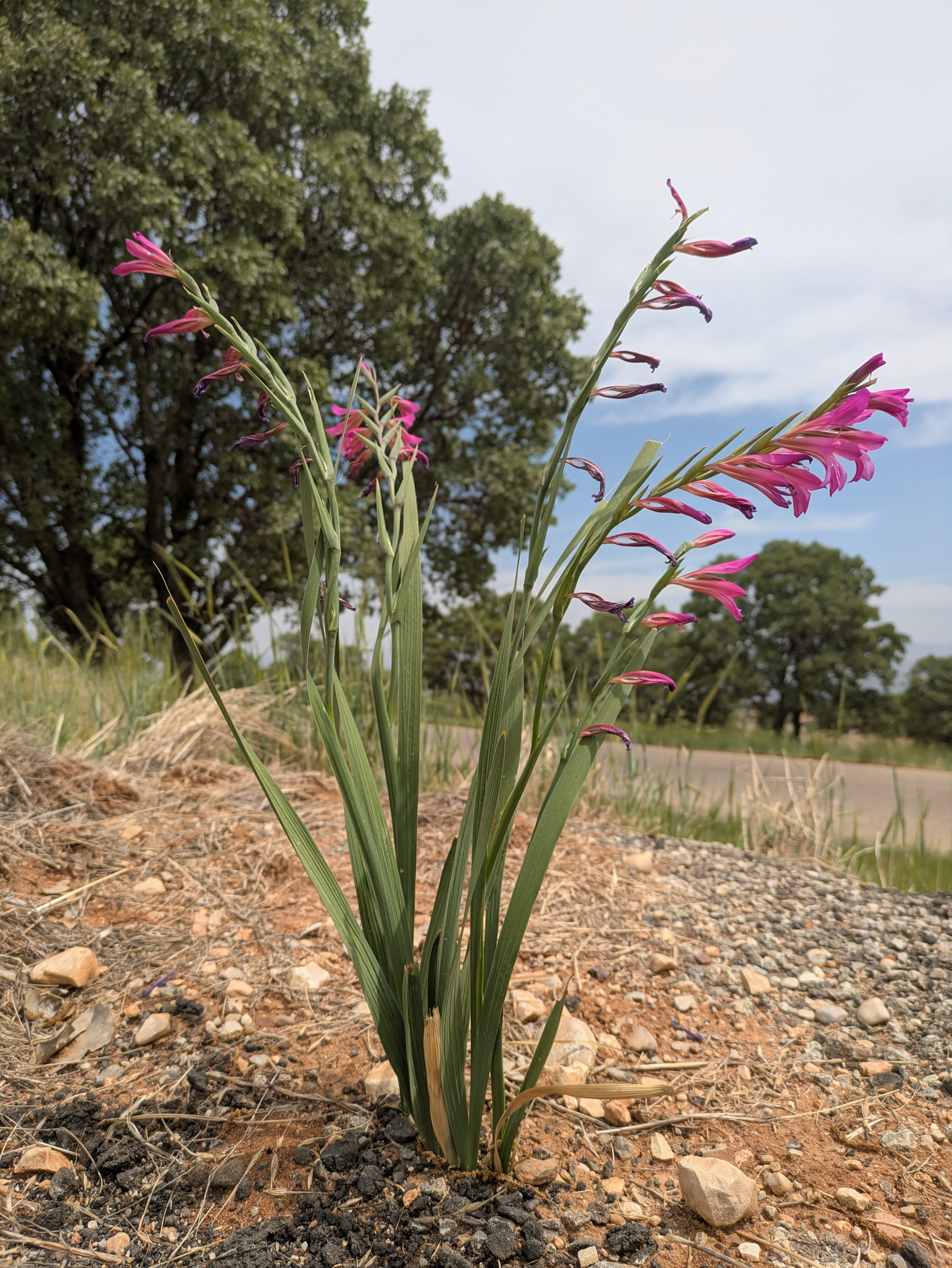
Gladiolus italicus in Iran

== Cultivation ==
In temperate zones, the corms of most species and hybrids should be lifted in autumn and stored over winter in a frost-free place, then replanted in spring. Some species from Europe and high altitudes in Africa, as well as the small 'Nanus' hybrids, are much hardier (to at least −26 °C or −15 °F) and can be left in the ground in regions with sufficiently dry winters. 'Nanus' is hardy to Zones 5–8. The large-flowered types require moisture during the growing season, and must be individually staked as soon as the sword-shaped flower heads appear. The leaves must be allowed to die down naturally before lifting and storing the corms. Plants are propagated either from small cormlets produced as offsets by the parent corms, or from seed. In either case, they take several years to get to flowering size. Clumps should be dug up and divided every few years to keep them vigorous.

They are affected by thrips (thrip simplex), and wasps Dasyproctus bipunctatus, which burrow into the flowers causing them to collapse and die.

== In culture ==
- Gladiolus is the birth flower of August.
- Gladioli are the flowers associated with a fortieth wedding anniversary.
- American Ragtime composer Scott Joplin composed a rag called "Gladiolus Rag".
- "Gladiolus" was the word Frank Neuhauser correctly spelled to win the 1st National Spelling Bee in 1925.
- The Australian comedian and personality Dame Edna Everage's signature flowers were gladioli, which she referred to as "gladdies".
- The ancient Graeco-Roman god Pluto was said to wear a wreath of what is traditionally identified as a type of Gladiolus, called phasganion or xiphion in Koine Greek.
- The Mancunian singer Morrissey is known to dance with gladioli hanging from his back pocket or in his hands, especially during the era of The Smiths. This trait of his was made known in the music video for "This Charming Man", where he swung a bunch of yellow gladioli while singing.
- Gladioli are traditionally given to people who finish the International Four Days Marches Nijmegen. This likely derives from their association with victory, from the time when gladiators were showered with them upon victory.
- Gladiolus is the symbolic flower of Punjab.
Gladiolus in art

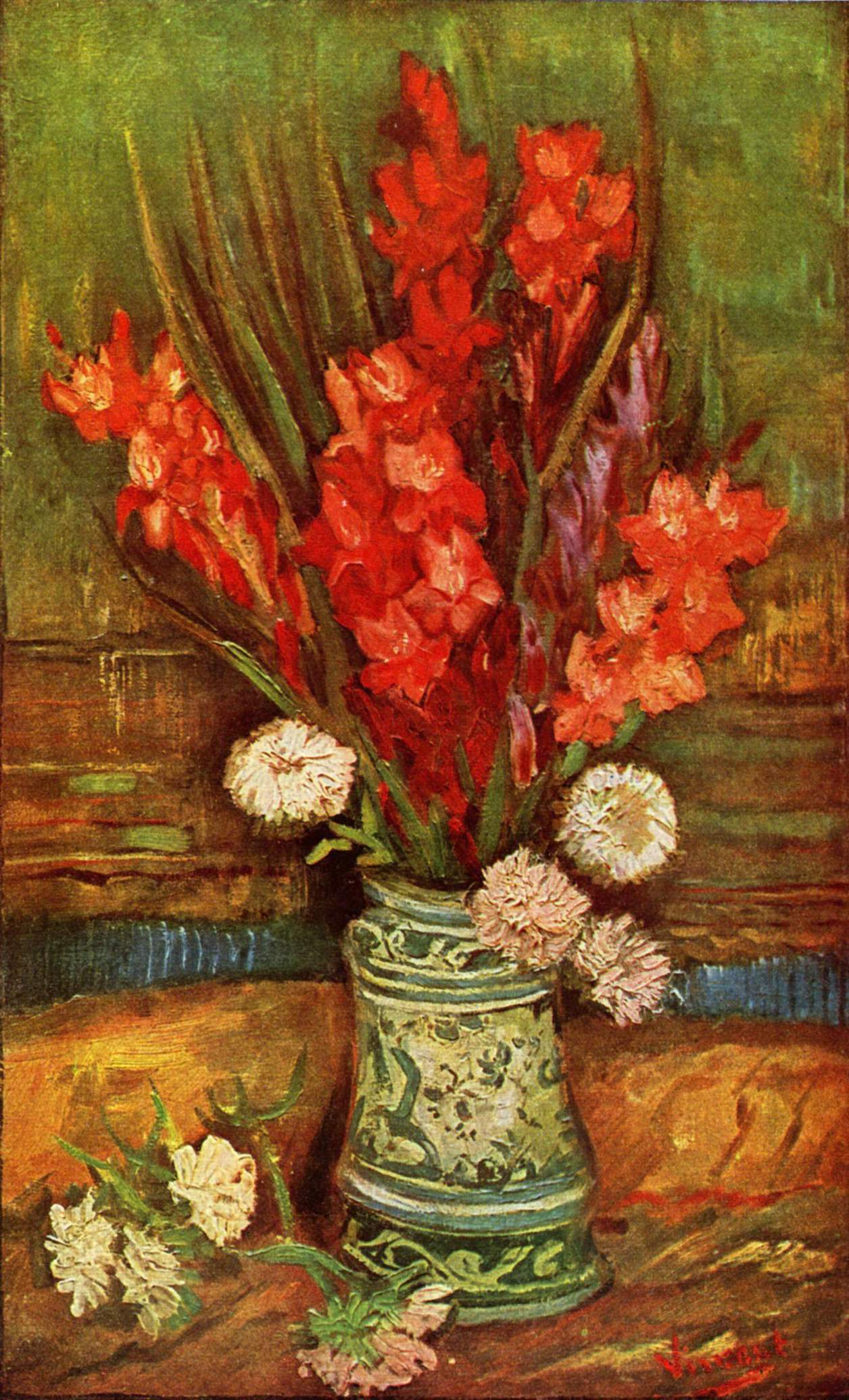
Vase with Red Gladioli (1886) by Vincent van Gogh

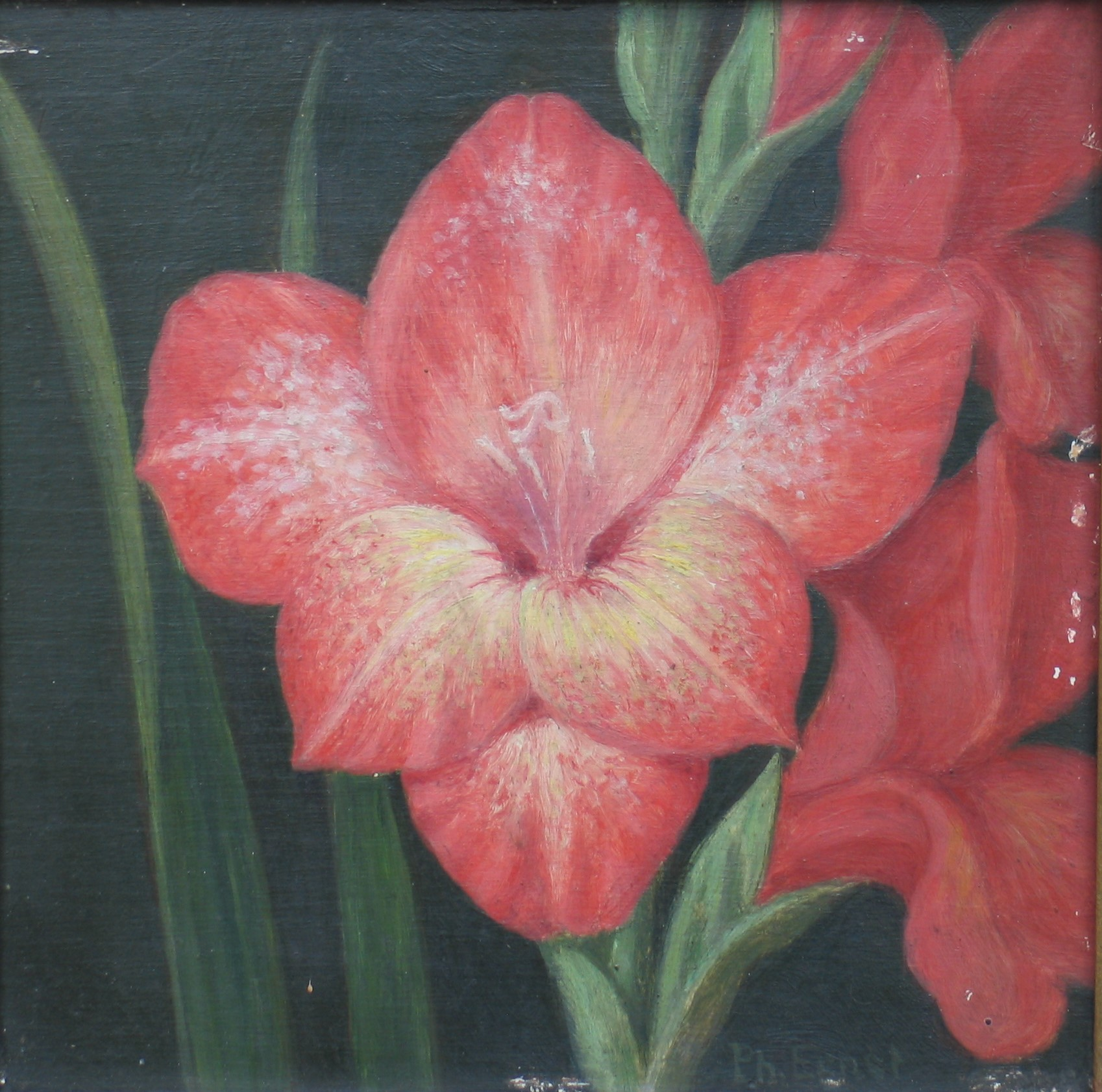
Gladiole by Philipp Ernst

== Bibliography ==
- G. R. Delpierre and N. M. du Plessis (1974). The winter-growing Gladioli of Southern Africa. Tafelberg-Uitgewers Beperk 120 colour photographs and descriptions.
- Peter Goldblatt (1996). A monograph of the genus Gladiolus in tropical Africa (83 species). Timber Press
- Peter Goldblatt, J. C. Manning (1998). Gladiolus in southern Africa: Systematics, Biology, and Evolution, including 144 watercolor paintings. Cape Town: Fernwood Press.
