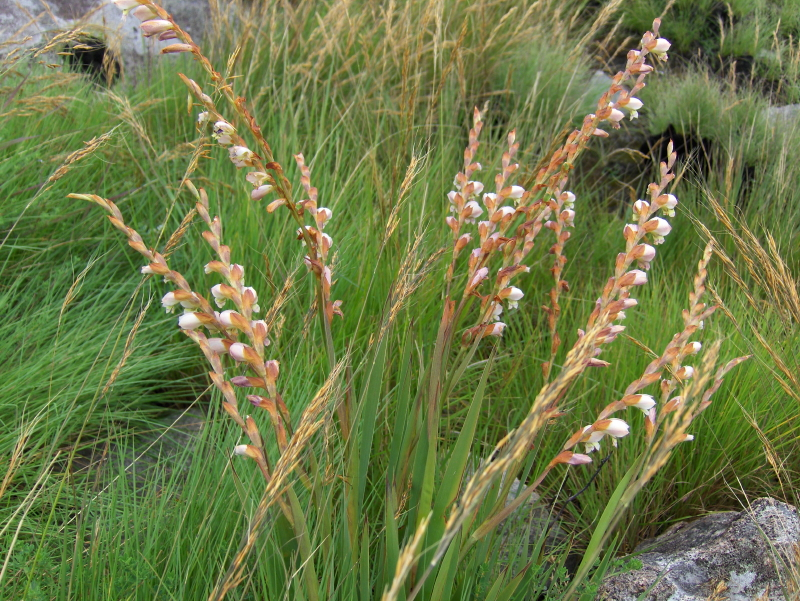

Scientific classification
- Kingdom: Plantae
- Clade: Tracheophytes
- Clade: Angiosperms
- Clade: Monocots
- Order: Asparagales
- Family: Iridaceae
- Genus: Gladiolus
- Species: G. crassifolius

Binomial name
- Gladiolus crassifolius Baker

= Gladiolus crassifolius =

Species of flowering plant

Gladiolus crassifolius is a species of Gladiolus found in Africa. It is a perennial species with substantial stems and brightly coloured flowers. There are many synonyms of Gladiolus crassifolius.

In tropical areas Gladiolus crassifolius is known as Gladiolus thomsonii. It is found in the Afro-alpine zone of Mount Kenya, up to around 3,300 m (11,000 ft). It has scarlet petals with yellow centres and a strong stem, and has been seen growing in a variety of habitats such as forest edges and open grassland.
