= Gladiolus pole-evansii =

Conservation status
- Vulnerable (IUCN 3.1)

Scientific classification
- Kingdom: Plantae
- Clade: Tracheophytes
- Clade: Angiosperms
- Clade: Monocots
- Order: Asparagales
- Family: Iridaceae
- Genus: Gladiolus
- Species: G. pole-evansii

Binomial name
- Gladiolus pole-evansii I.Verd.

Species of flowering plant

Gladiolus pole-evansii is a species of plant in the family Iridaceae. It is endemic to the Mpumalanga province of South Africa. Its natural habitat is subtropical or tropical dry shrubland.
