= Gladiolus aladagensis =

Scientific classification
- Kingdom: Plantae
- Clade: Tracheophytes
- Clade: Angiosperms
- Clade: Monocots
- Order: Asparagales
- Family: Iridaceae
- Genus: Gladiolus
- Species: G. aladagensis

Binomial name
- Gladiolus aladagensis Eker & Sağıroğlu

Species of plant

Gladiolus aladagensis (Turkish: Aladağ kılıçotu) is a species of flowering plant in the family Iridaceae. It is native to Bolu Province, in Northwest Turkey.

== Discovery ==
This species was discovered by Dr. Mehmet Sağıroğlu of Sakarya University and Dr. İsmail Eker of Bolu Abant İzzet Baysal University when they conducted a field study in Aladağlar.

=== Etymology ===
The name "aladagensis" derives from the Aladağlar region in Bolu, where this species was discovered.

== Description ==
It is morphologically similar to Gladiolus kotschyanus and Gladiolus italicus.
