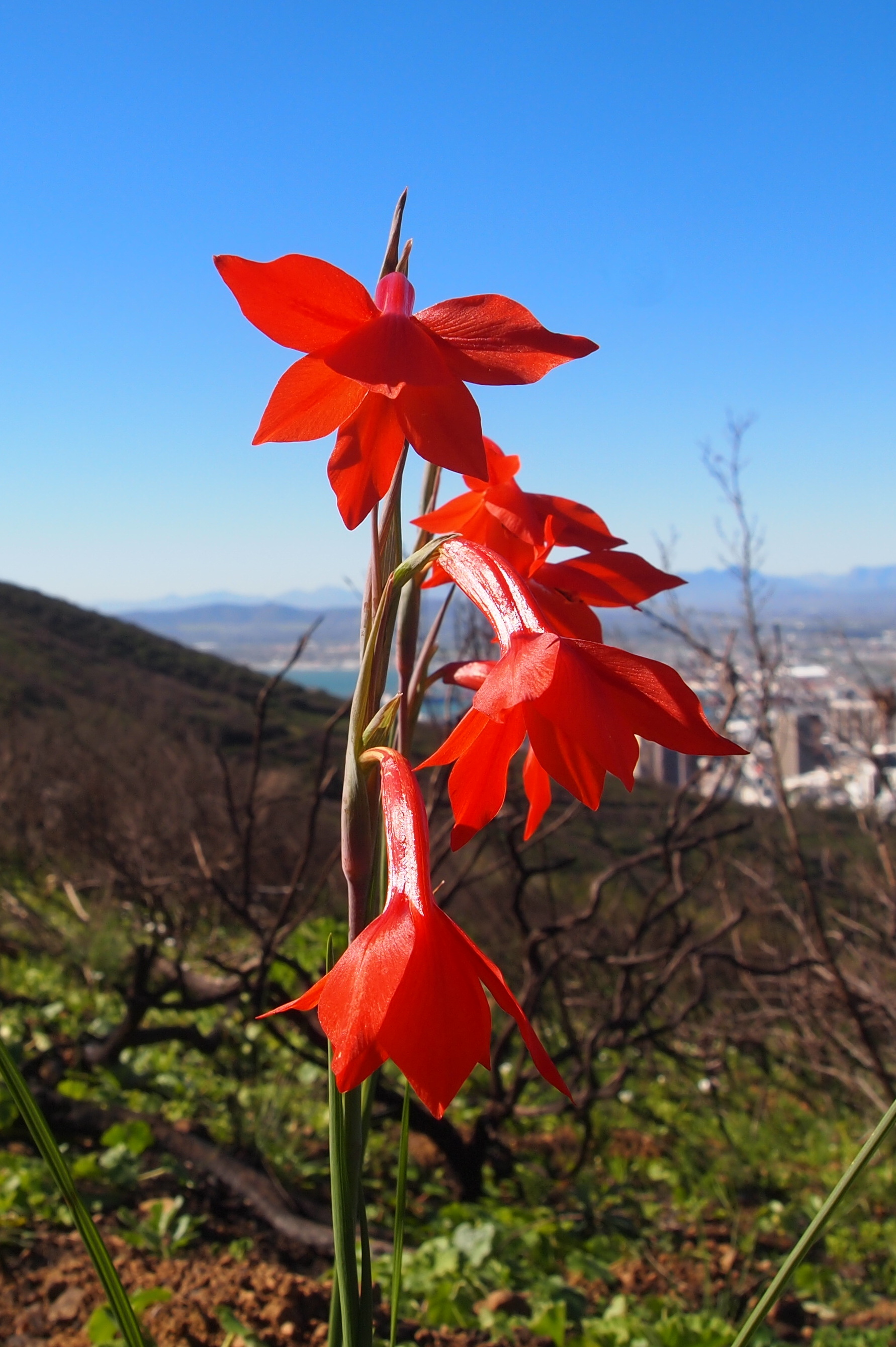

Scientific classification
- Kingdom: Plantae
- Clade: Tracheophytes
- Clade: Angiosperms
- Clade: Monocots
- Order: Asparagales
- Family: Iridaceae
- Genus: Gladiolus
- Species: G. watsonius

Binomial name
- Gladiolus watsonius Thunb.

Synonyms
- Homoglossum watsonium N.E. Br. Watsonia revoluta Pers. Antholyza watsonius (Thunb.) L.Bolus; Gladiolus recurvus Houtt. Gladiolus praecox Andrews; Watsonia praecox (Andrews) Pers; Homoglossum praecox (Andrews) Salisb; Gladiolus gawleri (Baker) Klatt Abh; Homoglossum acuminatum (N.E.Br.) N.E.Br.

= Gladiolus watsonius =

Species of flowering plant

Gladiolus watsonius is a Gladiolus species found in the granite slopes of Southwest Cape, South Africa.
