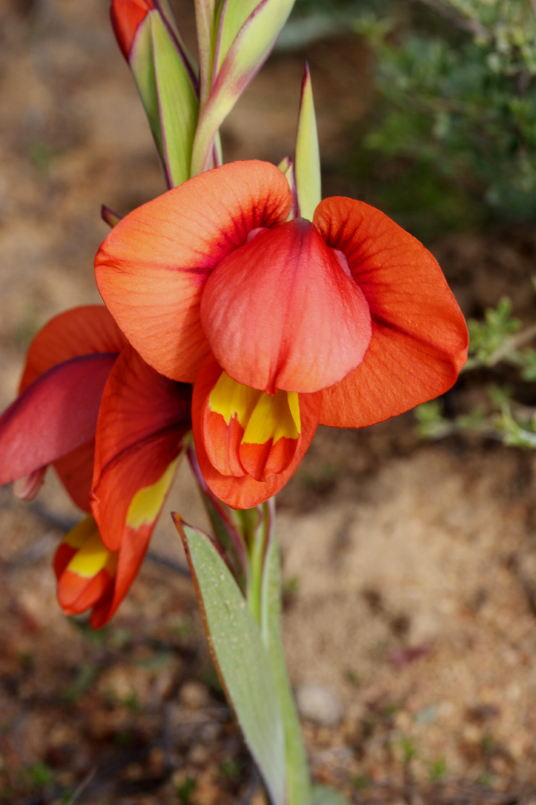

Scientific classification
- Kingdom: Plantae
- Clade: Tracheophytes
- Clade: Angiosperms
- Clade: Monocots
- Order: Asparagales
- Family: Iridaceae
- Genus: Gladiolus
- Species: G. equitans

Binomial name
- Gladiolus equitans Thunb.

Synonyms
- Gladiolus alatus var. namaquensis Baker

= Gladiolus equitans =

Species of flowering plant

Gladiolus equitans is a Gladiolus species found in the rocky hills in Namaqualand, South Africa.
