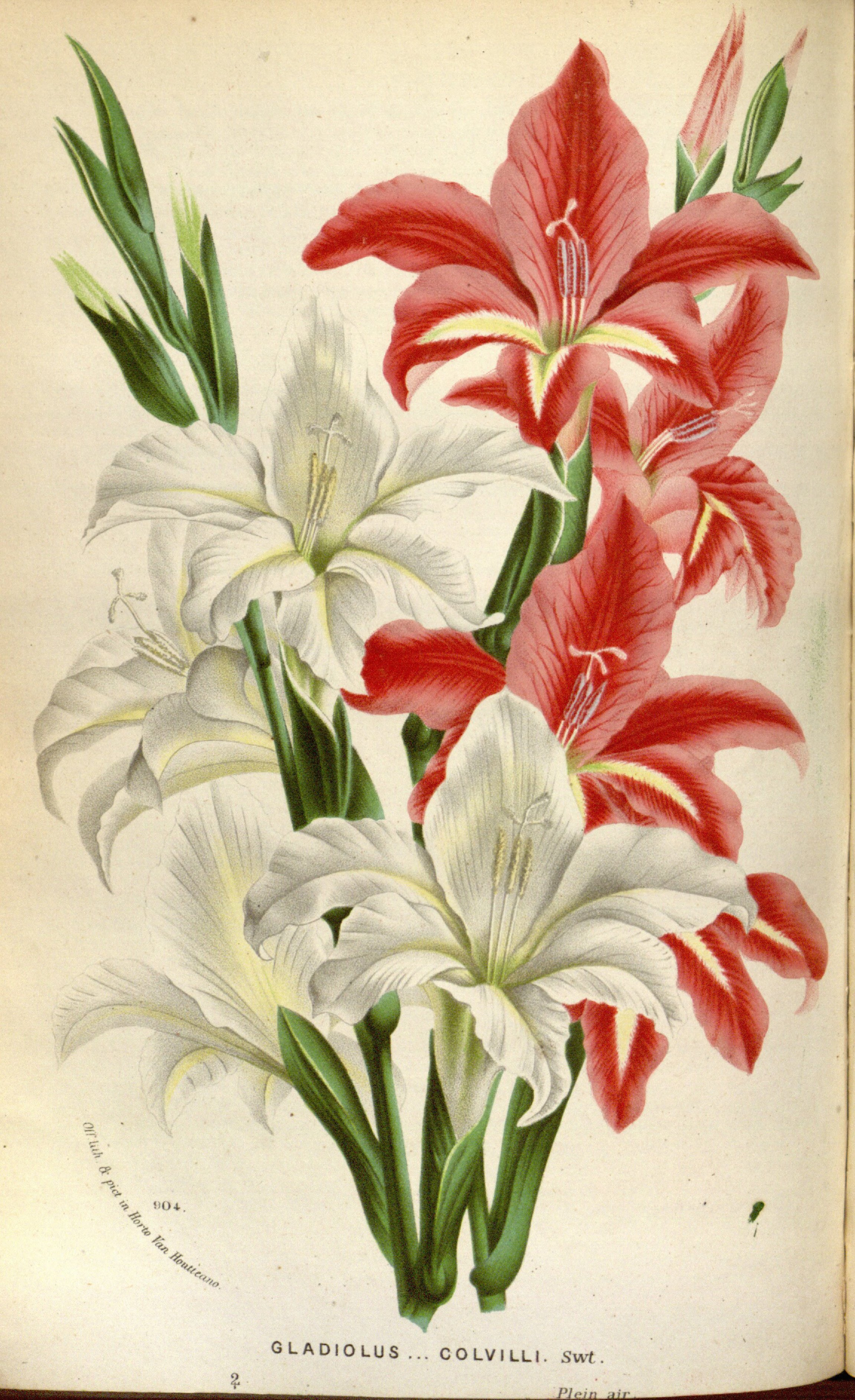

Scientific classification
- Kingdom: Plantae
- Clade: Tracheophytes
- Clade: Angiosperms
- Clade: Monocots
- Order: Asparagales
- Family: Iridaceae
- Genus: Gladiolus
- Species: G. × colvillii

Binomial name
- Gladiolus × colvillii Sweet

= Gladiolus × colvillii =

Species of flowering plant

Gladiolus × colvillii, the scarlet gladiolus, is a hybrid Gladiolus cultigen.

The original Gladiolus × colvillii was bred by the nurseryman James Colville of Chelsea, London from the southern African species G. tristis and G. cardinalis and first described in 1823; it is still cultivated. It has deep pink flowers with a cream stripe on each of the lower three tepals.

In 1826 James Colville put on sale a white form with pale pink anthers known as G. colvillii alba. In 1871, a completely white sport with the same parentage was described: G. colvillii 'The Bride'. This cultivar is still available commercially today under the same name.

The Colvillei group of Gladiolus now includes many small (to about 40 cm tall) spring-flowering cultivars with flowers from white to pink or orange-red. Some are likely to have other southern African species such as G. carneus in their ancestry.
