= Rubus clarus =

Scientific classification
- Kingdom: Plantae
- Clade: Tracheophytes
- Clade: Angiosperms
- Clade: Eudicots
- Clade: Rosids
- Order: Rosales
- Family: Rosaceae
- Genus: Rubus
- Species: R. clarus

Binomial name
- Rubus clarus L.H.Bailey 1943

Berry and plant

Rubus clarus, commonly known as the Mt. Vernon dewberry, is a rare North American species of flowering plant in the rose family. It has only been found in the state of Virginia, in the east-central United States.

The genetics of Rubus are extremely complex, making it challenging to determine which groups should be recognized as distinct species. This complexity is particularly problematic for rare species with limited ranges, such as Rubus clarus. Further study is recommended to clarify the taxonomy of this genus.
