= Rubus exeter =

Scientific classification
- Kingdom: Plantae
- Clade: Tracheophytes
- Clade: Angiosperms
- Clade: Eudicots
- Clade: Rosids
- Order: Rosales
- Family: Rosaceae
- Genus: Rubus
- Species: R. exeter

Binomial name
- Rubus exeter L.H.Bailey 1947

Synonyms
- Rubus exter L.H.Bailey

Species of fruit and plant

Rubus exeter is a rare North American species of flowering plant in the rose family. It has been found only in the north-central United States (Minnesota, Wisconsin, Indiana).

The genetics of Rubus is extremely complex, so that it is difficult to decide on which groups should be recognized as species. There are many rare species with limited ranges such as this. Further study is suggested to clarify the taxonomy.
