= Rubus iniens =

Scientific classification
- Kingdom: Plantae
- Clade: Embryophytes
- Clade: Tracheophytes
- Clade: Spermatophytes
- Clade: Angiosperms
- Clade: Eudicots
- Clade: Rosids
- Order: Rosales
- Family: Rosaceae
- Genus: Rubus
- Species: R. iniens

Binomial name
- Rubus iniens L.H.Bailey

Species of fruit and plant

Rubus iniens is a North American species of flowering plants in the rose family. It has been found only in the States of Virginia and Delaware in the east-central United States.

The genetics of Rubus is extremely complex, so that it is difficult to decide on which groups should be recognized as species. There are many rare species with limited ranges such as this. Further study is suggested to clarify the taxonomy.
