= Rubus kelloggii =

Scientific classification
- Kingdom: Plantae
- Clade: Tracheophytes
- Clade: Angiosperms
- Clade: Eudicots
- Clade: Rosids
- Order: Rosales
- Family: Rosaceae
- Genus: Rubus
- Species: R. kelloggii

Binomial name
- Rubus kelloggii L.H.Bailey 1945

Species of fruit and plant

Rubus kelloggii is a rare North American species of brambles in the rose family. It has been found only in the state of Missouri in central United States.

The genetics of Rubus is extremely complex, making it difficult to decide on which groups should be recognized as species. There are many rare species with limited ranges such as this. Further study is suggested to clarify the taxonomy.
