= Rubus nefrens =

Scientific classification
- Kingdom: Plantae
- Clade: Tracheophytes
- Clade: Angiosperms
- Clade: Eudicots
- Clade: Rosids
- Order: Rosales
- Family: Rosaceae
- Genus: Rubus
- Species: R. nefrens

Binomial name
- Rubus nefrens L.H.Bailey 1925

Species of fruit and plant

Rubus nefrens is a rare North American species of brambles in the rose family. It has been found in scattered locations in the central United States, in Missouri, Iowa, Kentucky, and Ohio. Nowhere is it very common.

The genetics of Rubus is extremely complex, so that it is difficult to decide on which groups should be recognized as species. There are many rare species with limited ranges such as this. Further study is suggested to clarify the taxonomy.
