= Rubus apogaeus =

Scientific classification
- Kingdom: Plantae
- Clade: Tracheophytes
- Clade: Angiosperms
- Clade: Eudicots
- Clade: Rosids
- Order: Rosales
- Family: Rosaceae
- Genus: Rubus
- Species: R. apogaeus

Binomial name
- Rubus apogaeus L.H.Bailey 1941

Synonyms
- Rubus exlex L.H.Bailey; Rubus lassus L.H.Bailey; Rubus lundelliorum L.H.Bailey; Rubus uncus L.H.Bailey

Species of plant

Rubus apogaeus, the falling dewberry, is a North American species of southern dewberry in section Verotriviales of the genus Rubus, a member of the rose family. It is found in scattered locations in the southern United States (Texas, Mississippi, Alabama, Georgia, Florida).
