= Rubus porteri =

Scientific classification
- Kingdom: Plantae
- Clade: Tracheophytes
- Clade: Angiosperms
- Clade: Eudicots
- Clade: Rosids
- Order: Rosales
- Family: Rosaceae
- Genus: Rubus
- Species: R. porteri

Binomial name
- Rubus porteri L.H. Bailey

Species of fruit and plant

Rubus porteri is a rare North American species of brambles in the rose family. It has been found only in the States of West Virginia and Pennsylvania in the eastern United States.

The genetics of Rubus is extremely complex, so that it is difficult to decide on which groups should be recognized as species. There are many rare species with limited ranges such as this. Further study is suggested to clarify the taxonomy.
