= Rubus notatus =

Scientific classification
- Kingdom: Plantae
- Clade: Tracheophytes
- Clade: Angiosperms
- Clade: Eudicots
- Clade: Rosids
- Order: Rosales
- Family: Rosaceae
- Genus: Rubus
- Species: R. notatus

Binomial name
- Rubus notatus L.H.Bailey 1941

Synonyms
- Rubus boottianus L.H.Bailey

Species of fruit and plant

Rubus notatus is an uncommon North American species of brambles in the rose family. It grows in northeastern United States from Maine to West Virginia, with reports of isolated populations in Michigan.

The genetics of Rubus is extremely complex, so that it is difficult to decide on which groups should be recognized as species. There are many rare species with limited ranges such as this. Further study is suggested to clarify the taxonomy.
