= Rubus audax =

Scientific classification
- Kingdom: Plantae
- Clade: Tracheophytes
- Clade: Angiosperms
- Clade: Eudicots
- Clade: Rosids
- Order: Rosales
- Family: Rosaceae
- Genus: Rubus
- Species: R. audax

Binomial name
- Rubus audax L.H.Bailey 1932

Berry and plant

Rubus audax, the Tampa blackberry, is an uncommon North American species of flowering plant in the rose family. It is found in scattered locations in the southeastern United States (Florida, Georgia, and the Carolinas).

The genetics of Rubus is extremely complex, so that it is difficult to decide on which groups should be recognized as species. There are many rare species with limited ranges such as this. Further study is suggested to clarify the taxonomy.
