= Rubus burnhamii =

Scientific classification
- Kingdom: Plantae
- Clade: Tracheophytes
- Clade: Angiosperms
- Clade: Eudicots
- Clade: Rosids
- Order: Rosales
- Family: Rosaceae
- Genus: Rubus
- Species: R. burnhamii

Binomial name
- Rubus burnhamii L.H.Bailey 1945

Berry and plant

Rubus burnhamii, or Burnham's blackberry, is a rare North American species of flowering plant in the rose family. It has been found only in the State of New York in the northeastern United States.

The genetics of Rubus is extremely complex, so that it is difficult to decide on which groups should be recognized as species. There are many rare species with limited ranges such as this. Further study is suggested to clarify the taxonomy.
