= Carex pertenuis =

Scientific classification
- Kingdom: Plantae
- Clade: Tracheophytes
- Clade: Angiosperms
- Clade: Monocots
- Clade: Commelinids
- Order: Poales
- Family: Cyperaceae
- Genus: Carex
- Species: C. pertenuis

Binomial name
- Carex pertenuis L.H.Bailey

Species of plant

Carex pertenuis is a tussock-forming species of perennial sedge in the family Cyperaceae.

== Distribution ==
It is native to southern parts of Mexico and northern parts of Central America. Much like other Carex species, C. pertenuis is quite rare with few concentrated populations.

== See also ==
- List of Carex species
