= Rubus plus =

Scientific classification
- Kingdom: Plantae
- Clade: Tracheophytes
- Clade: Angiosperms
- Clade: Eudicots
- Clade: Rosids
- Order: Rosales
- Family: Rosaceae
- Genus: Rubus
- Species: R. plus

Binomial name
- Rubus plus L.H.Bailey

Synonyms
- Rubus kalamazoensis L.H.Bailey

Species of fruit and plant

Rubus plus is a rare North American species of brambles in the rose family. It grows in the states of Michigan, Indiana, and Wisconsin in the north-central United States.

The genetics of Rubus is extremely complex, so that it is difficult to decide on which groups should be recognized as species. There are many rare species with limited ranges such as this. Further study is suggested to clarify the taxonomy.
