= Rubus rosarius =

Scientific classification
- Kingdom: Plantae
- Clade: Tracheophytes
- Clade: Angiosperms
- Clade: Eudicots
- Clade: Rosids
- Order: Rosales
- Family: Rosaceae
- Genus: Rubus
- Species: R. rosarius

Binomial name
- Rubus rosarius L.H.Bailey

Synonyms
- Rubus libratus L.H.Bailey

Species of fruit and plant

Rubus rosarius is a rare North American species of brambles in the rose family. It has been found only in the States of Maryland, Delaware, and Virginia in the eastern United States.

The genetics of Rubus is extremely complex, so that it is difficult to decide on which groups should be recognized as species. There are many rare species with limited ranges such as this. Further study is suggested to clarify the taxonomy.
