= Carex californica =

Scientific classification
- Kingdom: Plantae
- Clade: Tracheophytes
- Clade: Angiosperms
- Clade: Monocots
- Clade: Commelinids
- Order: Poales
- Family: Cyperaceae
- Genus: Carex
- Species: C. californica

Binomial name
- Carex californica L.H.Bailey

Species of plant

Carex californica is a tussock-forming species of perennial sedge in the family Cyperaceae. It is native to western parts of the United States.

The sedges have long rhizomes and form colonies. The smooth to roughly textured culms are 15 to 60 cm (5.9 to 23.6 in) in length. The bladeless leaves have a purple tinge and have fibrous proximal sheaths with a diameter of 2 to 6 mm (0.079 to 0.236 in) with small projections that are 2 to 6 mm (0.079 to 0.236 in) long and sometimes wider than they are long. The inflorescences are 4 to 15 cm (1.6 to 5.9 in) in length.

The species was first described by the botanist Liberty Hyde Bailey in 1889 as a part of Memoirs of the Torrey Botanical Club. It has one synonym; Carex polymorpha var. californica as described by Georg Kukenthal.

== See also ==
- List of Carex species
