= Cultivated plant =

A cultivated plant may refer to:

- Another term for a plant crop
- A cultigen
- A plant in cultivation
