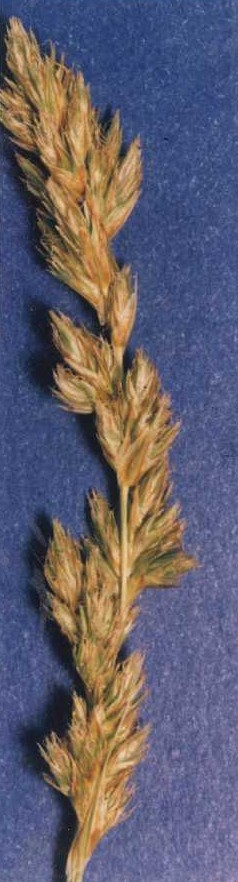

Scientific classification
- Kingdom: Plantae
- Clade: Tracheophytes
- Clade: Angiosperms
- Clade: Monocots
- Clade: Commelinids
- Order: Poales
- Family: Cyperaceae
- Genus: Carex
- Species: C. alma

Binomial name
- Carex alma L.H.Bailey

Synonyms
- Carex agrostoides Carex vitrea

= Carex alma =

Species of grass-like plant

Carex alma is a species of sedge known by the common name sturdy sedge. It is native to the southwestern United States and northern Mexico, where it grows in moist spots in a number of habitat types. This sedge forms a thick clump of thin stems up to 90 centimeters in length and long, thready leaves. The leaves have basal sheaths with conspicuous red coloration, often spotting. The inflorescence is a dense to open cluster of many spikelets occurring both at the ends of stems and at nodes. Each cluster is up to 15 centimeters long and 1 to 2 wide. The plant is sometimes dioecious, with an individual sedge bearing either male or female flowers. The female, pistillate flowers have white or white-edged bracts. The male, staminate flowers have visible anthers 2 millimeters long or longer. The fruit is coated in a sac called a perigynium which is gold to dark brown in color and has a characteristic bit of spongy tissue at the base.
