= Rubus obvius =

Scientific classification
- Kingdom: Plantae
- Clade: Tracheophytes
- Clade: Angiosperms
- Clade: Eudicots
- Clade: Rosids
- Order: Rosales
- Family: Rosaceae
- Genus: Rubus
- Species: R. obvius

Binomial name
- Rubus obvius L.H.Bailey 1943

Species of fruit and plant

Rubus obvius is a rare North American species of brambles in the rose family. It is endemic to the State of Maryland in the eastern United States.

The genetics of Rubus is extremely complex, so that it is difficult to decide on which groups should be recognized as species. There are many rare species with a limited range such as this. Further study is suggested to clarify the taxonomy.
