= Rubus variispinus =

Scientific classification
- Kingdom: Plantae
- Clade: Tracheophytes
- Clade: Angiosperms
- Clade: Eudicots
- Clade: Rosids
- Order: Rosales
- Family: Rosaceae
- Genus: Rubus
- Species: R. variispinus

Binomial name
- Rubus variispinus L.H.Bailey

Species of fruit and plant

Rubus variispinus is a rare North American species of flowering plants in the rose family. It is found only in the States of Michigan and Wisconsin in the north-central United States.

The genetics of Rubus is extremely complex, so that it is difficult to decide on which groups should be recognized as species. There are many rare species with limited ranges such as this. Further study is suggested to clarify the taxonomy.
