= Cultivar =

Plant or grouping of plants selected for desirable characteristics

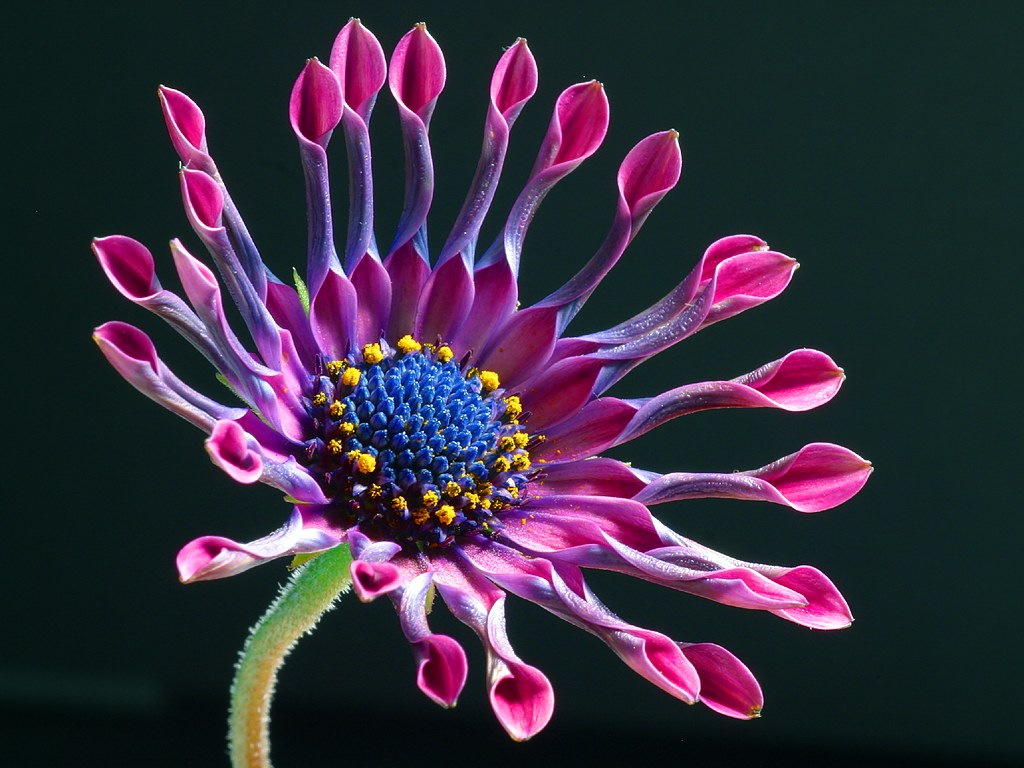
Osteospermum 'Pink Whirls' A cultivar selected for its brightly coloured flowers with unusual fluted petal structure

A cultivar is a kind of cultivated plant that people have selected for desired traits and which retains those traits when propagated. Methods used to propagate cultivars include division, root and stem cuttings, offsets, grafting, tissue culture, or carefully controlled seed production. Most cultivars arise from deliberate human manipulation, but some originate from wild plants that have distinctive characteristics. Cultivar names are chosen according to rules of the International Code of Nomenclature for Cultivated Plants (ICNCP), and not all cultivated plants qualify as cultivars. Horticulturists generally believe the word cultivar (Note: Cultivar (English: /ˈkʌltɪˌvɑːr, -ˌvɛər/) has two meanings, as explained in Formal definition: it is a classification category and a taxonomic unit within the category. When referring to a taxon, the word does not apply to an individual plant but to all plants that share the unique characteristics that define the cultivar.) was coined as a term meaning "cultivated variety".

Popular ornamental plants like roses, camellias, daffodils, rhododendrons, and azaleas are commonly cultivars produced by breeding and selection or as sports, for floral colour or size, plant form, or other desirable characteristics. Similarly, the world's agricultural food crops are almost exclusively cultivars that have been selected for characters such as improved yield, flavour, and resistance to disease. Since the advent of genetic engineering in the 1970s and the rise of its application in crop breeding in the 1980s, some food crops are genetically engineered. Trees used in forestry are also special selections grown for their enhanced quality and yield of timber, for example American timber company Weyerhaeuser is the leading grower of genetically modified Douglas-fir trees, one of the most commonly harvested trees.

Cultivars form a major part of Liberty Hyde Bailey's broader group, the cultigen, which is defined as a plant whose origin or selection is primarily due to intentional human activity. A cultivar is not the same as a botanical variety, which is a taxonomic rank below subspecies, and there are differences in the rules for creating and using the names of botanical varieties and cultivars. Since the creation of the Plant Patent Act of 1930 the naming of cultivars has been complicated by the use of statutory patents for plants and recognition of plant breeders' rights.

The International Union for the Protection of New Varieties of Plants (UPOV – French: Union internationale pour la protection des obtentions végétales) offers legal protection of plant cultivars to persons or organisations that introduce new cultivars to commerce. UPOV requires that a cultivar be "distinct", "uniform", and "stable". To be "distinct", it must have characters that easily distinguish it from any other named cultivar. To be "uniform" and "stable", the cultivar must retain these characters in repeated propagation.

The naming of cultivars is an important aspect of cultivated plant taxonomy, and the correct naming of a cultivar is prescribed by the Rules and Recommendations of the International Code of Nomenclature for Cultivated Plants (ICNCP, often called the Cultivated Plant Code). A cultivar is given a cultivar name, which consists of the scientific Latin botanical name followed by a cultivar epithet. The cultivar epithet is usually in a vernacular language, and must be so for cultivars named after 1 January 1959.

== Etymology ==
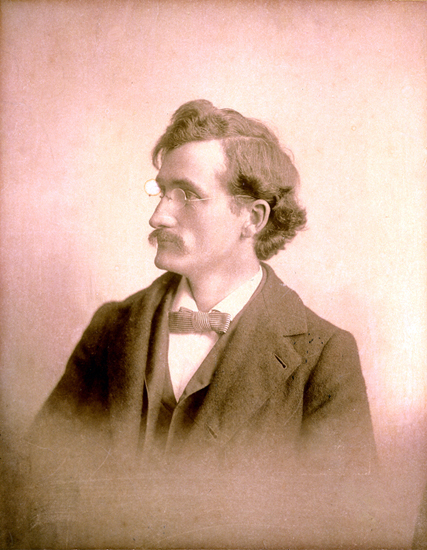
Liberty Hyde Bailey (1858–1954) coined the words cultigen in 1918 and cultivar in 1923.

The word cultivar originated from the need to distinguish between wild plants and those with characteristics that arose in cultivation, presently denominated cultigens. This distinction dates to the Greek philosopher Theophrastus (370–285 BC), the "Father of Botany", who was keenly aware of this difference. Botanical historian Alan Morton noted that Theophrastus in his Historia Plantarum (Enquiry into Plants) "had an inkling of the limits of culturally induced (phenotypic) changes and of the importance of genetic constitution" (Historia Plantarum, Book 3, 2, 2 and Causa Plantarum, Book 1, 9, 3).

The International Code of Nomenclature for algae, fungi, and plants uses as its starting point for modern botanical nomenclature the Latin names in Linnaeus' (1707–1778) Species Plantarum (tenth edition) and Genera Plantarum (fifth edition). In Species Plantarum, Linnaeus enumerated all plants known to him, either directly or from his extensive reading. He recognised the rank of varietas (botanical "variety", a rank below that of species and subspecies) and he indicated these varieties with letters of the Greek alphabet, such as α, β, and δ, before the variety name, rather than using the abbreviation "var." as is the present convention. Most of the varieties that Linnaeus enumerated were of "garden" origin rather than being wild plants.

In time the need to distinguish between wild plants and those with variations that had been cultivated increased. In the nineteenth century many "garden-derived" plants were given horticultural names, sometimes in Latin and sometimes in a vernacular language. From circa the 1900s, cultivated plants in Europe were recognised in the Scandinavian, Germanic, and Slavic literature as stamm or sorte, but these words could not be used internationally because, by international agreement, any new denominations had to be in Latin. In the twentieth century an improved international nomenclature was proposed for cultivated plants.

Liberty Hyde Bailey of Cornell University in New York, United States created the word cultivar in 1923 when he wrote that:

The cultigen is a species, or its equivalent, that has appeared under domestication – the plant is cultigenous. I now propose another name, cultivar, for a botanical variety, or for a race subordinate to species, that has originated under cultivation; it is not necessarily, however, referable to a recognised botanical species. It is essentially the equivalent of the botanical variety except in respect to its origin.

In that essay, Bailey used only the rank of species for the cultigen, but it was obvious to him that many domesticated plants were more like botanical varieties than species, and that realisation appears to have motivated the suggestion of the new category of cultivar.

Bailey created the word cultivar. It is generally assumed to be a blend of cultivated and variety but Bailey never explicitly stated his choice of etymology, and it has been suggested that the word is actually a blend of cultigen and variety. The neologism cultivar was promoted as "euphonious" and "free from ambiguity". (Note: This ignored its prior use as a transitive verb in Spanish denoting "to farm, to cultivate, to grow, or to practice" (Online Spanish dictionary), and in Portuguese denoting to cultivate, to husband, to farm, to plant, to polish, to reclaim, to improve (Ectaco online Portuguese dictionary).) The first Cultivated Plant Code of 1953 subsequently commended its use, and by 1960 it had achieved common international acceptance.

=== Cultigens ===
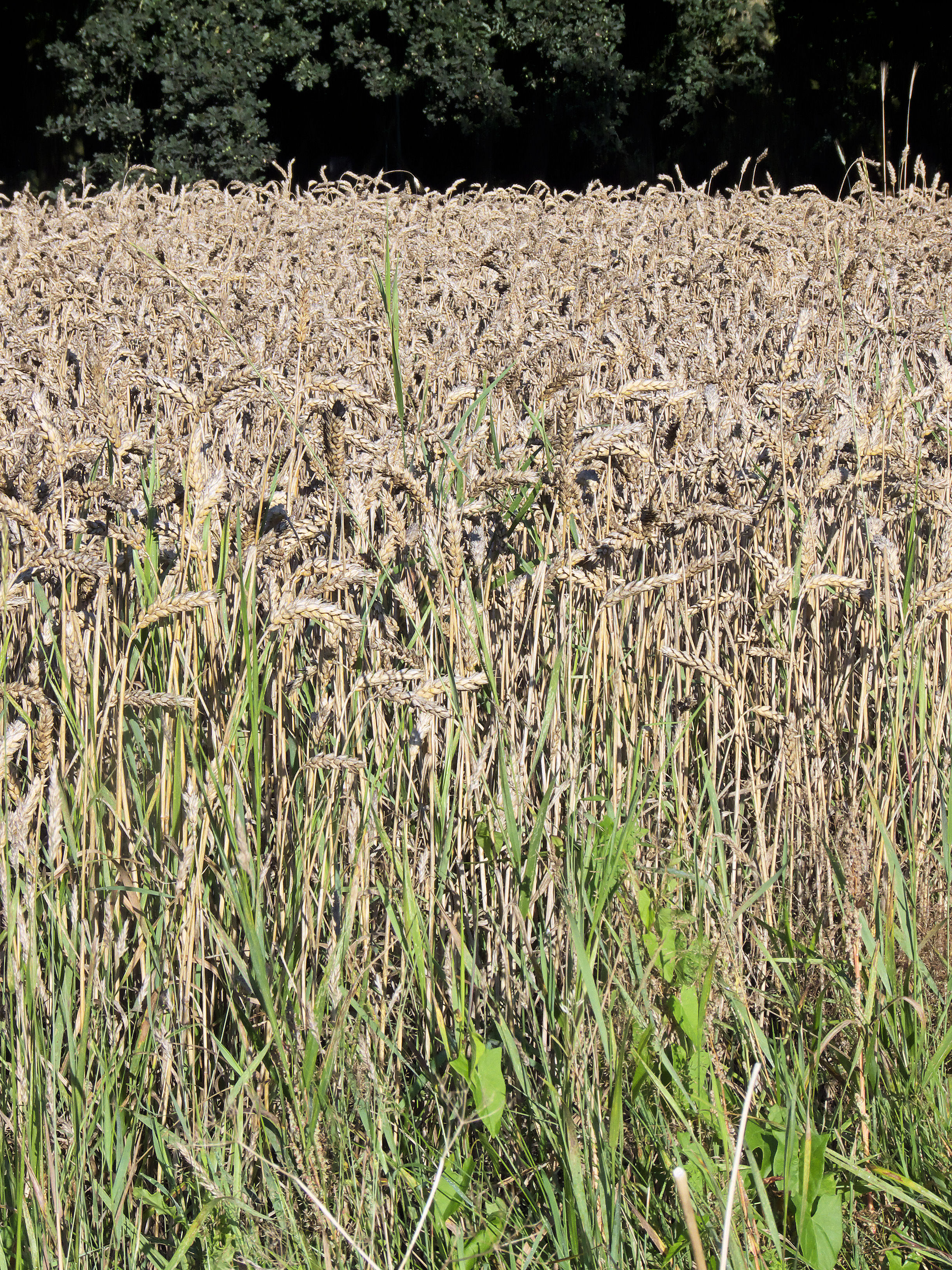
Bread wheat, Triticum aestivum, is considered a cultigen, and is a distinct species from other wheats according to the biological species concept. Many different cultivars have been created within this cultigen. Many other cultigens are not considered to be distinct species, and can be denominated otherwise.

The words cultigen and cultivar may be confused with each other. A cultigen is any plant that is deliberately selected for or altered in cultivation, as opposed to an indigen; the Cultivated Plant Code states that cultigens are "maintained as recognisable entities solely by continued propagation". Cultigens can have names at any of many taxonomic ranks, including those of grex, species, cultivar group, variety, form, and cultivar; and they may be plants that have been altered in cultivation, including by genetic modification, but have not been formally denominated. A cultigen or a component of a cultigen can be accepted as a cultivar if it is recognisable and has stable characters. Therefore, all cultivars are cultigens, because they are cultivated, but not all cultigens are cultivars, because some cultigens have not been formally distinguished and named as cultivars.

== Formal definition ==
The Cultivated Plant Code notes that the word cultivar is used in two different senses: first, as a "classification category" the cultivar is defined in Article 2 of the International Code of Nomenclature for Cultivated Plants (2009, 8th edition) as follows: The basic category of cultivated plants whose nomenclature is governed by this Code is the cultivar. There are two other classification categories for cultigens, the grex and the group. The Code then defines a cultivar as a "taxonomic unit within the classification category of cultivar". This is the sense of cultivar that is most generally understood and which is used as a general definition.

A cultivar is an assemblage of plants that (a) has been selected for a particular character or combination of characters, (b) is distinct, uniform and stable in those characters, and (c) when propagated by appropriate means, retains those characters.

A cultivar may be given a vernacular name or a number.

== Different kinds ==
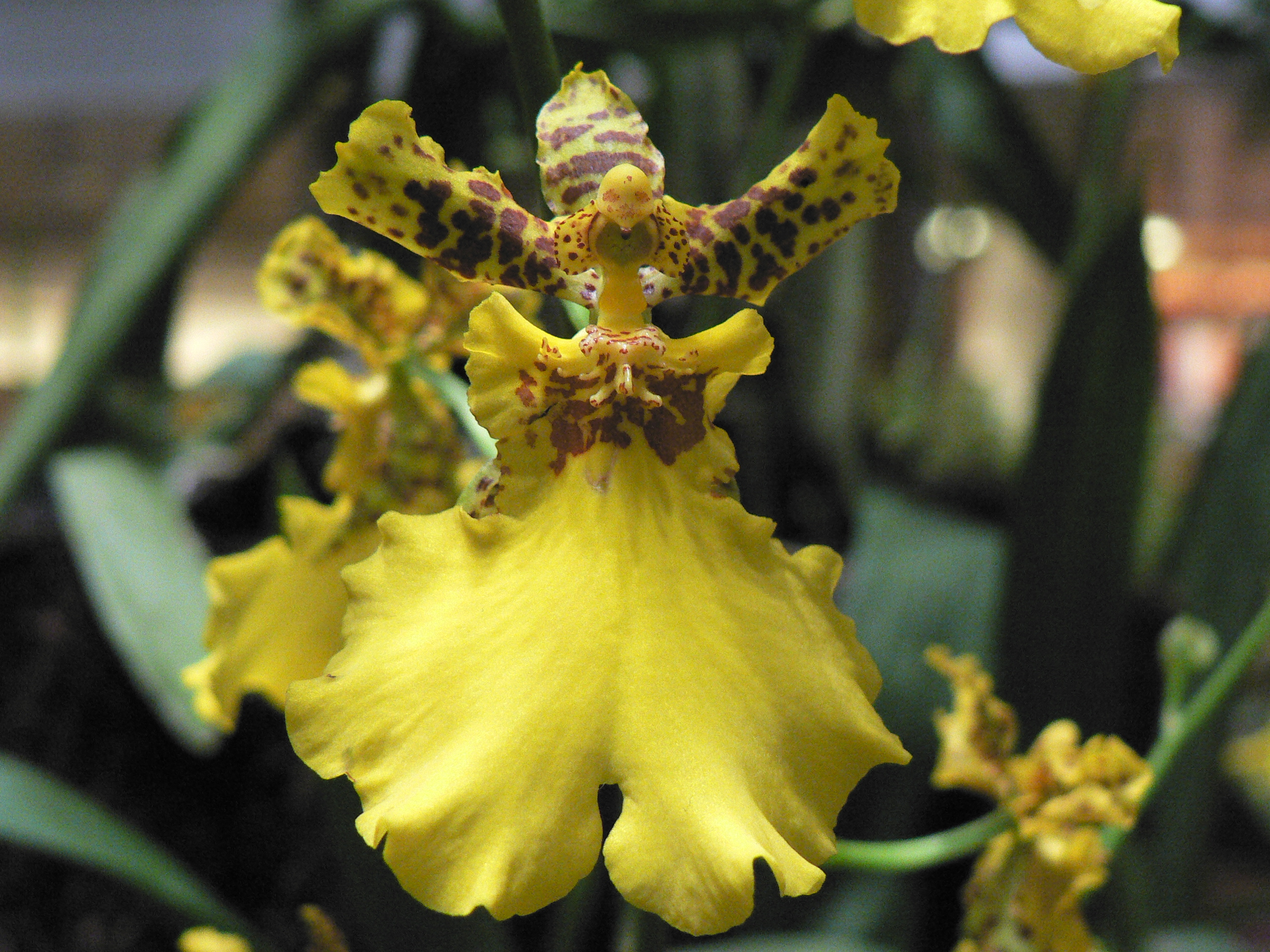
A cultivar of the orchid genus Oncidium

Which plants are chosen to be named as cultivars is simply a matter of convenience as the category was created to serve the practical needs of horticulture, agriculture, and forestry.

Members of a particular cultivar are not necessarily genetically identical. The Cultivated Plant Code emphasizes that different cultivated plants may be accepted as different cultivars, even if they have the same genome, while cultivated plants with different genomes may be regarded as the same cultivar. The production of cultivars generally entails considerable human involvement although in a few cases it may be as little as simply selecting variation from plants growing in the wild (whether by collecting growing tissue to propagate from or by gathering seed).

Cultivars generally occur as ornamentals and food crops: Malus 'Granny Smith' and Malus 'Red Delicious' are cultivars of apples propagated by cuttings or grafting, Lactuca 'Red Sails' and Lactuca 'Great Lakes' are lettuce cultivars propagated by seeds. Named cultivars of Hosta and Hemerocallis plants are cultivars produced by micropropagation or division.

=== Clones ===
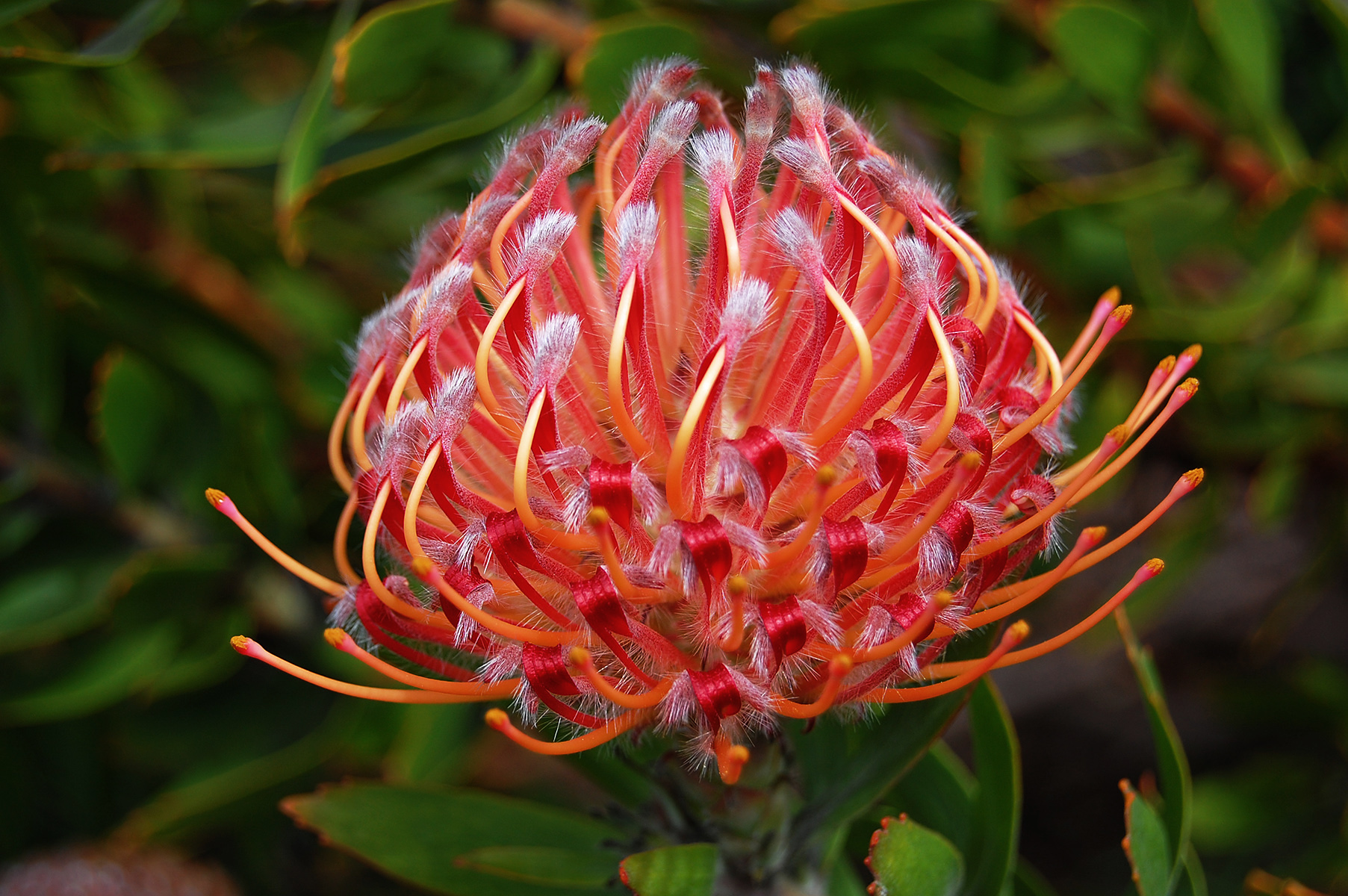
Leucospermum 'Scarlet Ribbon' A cross performed in Tasmania between L. glabrum and L. tottum

Cultivars that are produced asexually are genetically identical and known as clones; this includes plants propagated by division, layering, cuttings, grafts, and budding. The propagating material may be taken from a particular part of the plant, such as a lateral branch, or from a particular phase of the life cycle, such as a juvenile leaf, or from aberrant growth as occurs with witch's broom. Plants whose distinctive characters are derived from the presence of an intracellular organism may also form a cultivar provided the characters are reproduced reliably from generation to generation. Plants of the same chimera (which have mutant tissues close to normal tissue) or graft-chimeras (which have vegetative tissue from different kinds of plants and which originate by grafting) may also constitute a cultivar.

=== Seed-produced ===
Some cultivars "come true from seed", retaining their distinguishing characteristics when grown from seed. Such plants are termed a "variety", "selection", or "strain" but these are ambiguous and confusing words that are best avoided. In general, asexually propagated cultivars grown from seeds produce highly variable seedling plants, and should not be labelled with, or sold under, the parent cultivar's name.

Seed-raised cultivars may be produced by uncontrolled pollination when characteristics that are distinct, uniform and stable are passed from parents to progeny. Some are produced as "lines" that are produced by repeated self-fertilisation or inbreeding or "multilines" that are made up of several closely related lines. Sometimes they are F1 hybrids which are the result of a deliberate repeatable single cross between two pure lines. A few F2 hybrid seed cultivars also exist, such as Achillea 'Summer Berries'.

Some cultivars are agamospermous plants, which retain their genetic composition and characteristics under reproduction. Occasionally cultivars are raised from seed of a specially selected provenance – for example the seed may be taken from plants that are resistant to a particular disease.

=== Genetically modified ===
Genetically modified plants with characteristics resulting from the deliberate implantation of genetic material from a different germplasm may form a cultivar. However, the International Code of Nomenclature for Cultivated Plants notes, "In practice such an assemblage is often marketed from one or more lines or multilines that have been genetically modified. These lines or multilines often remain in a constant state of development which makes the naming of such an assemblage as a cultivar a futile exercise." However, retired transgenic varieties such as the fish tomato, which are no longer being developed, do not run into this obstacle and can be given a cultivar name.

Cultivars may be selected because of a change in the ploidy level of a plant which may produce more desirable characteristics.

== Cultivar names ==
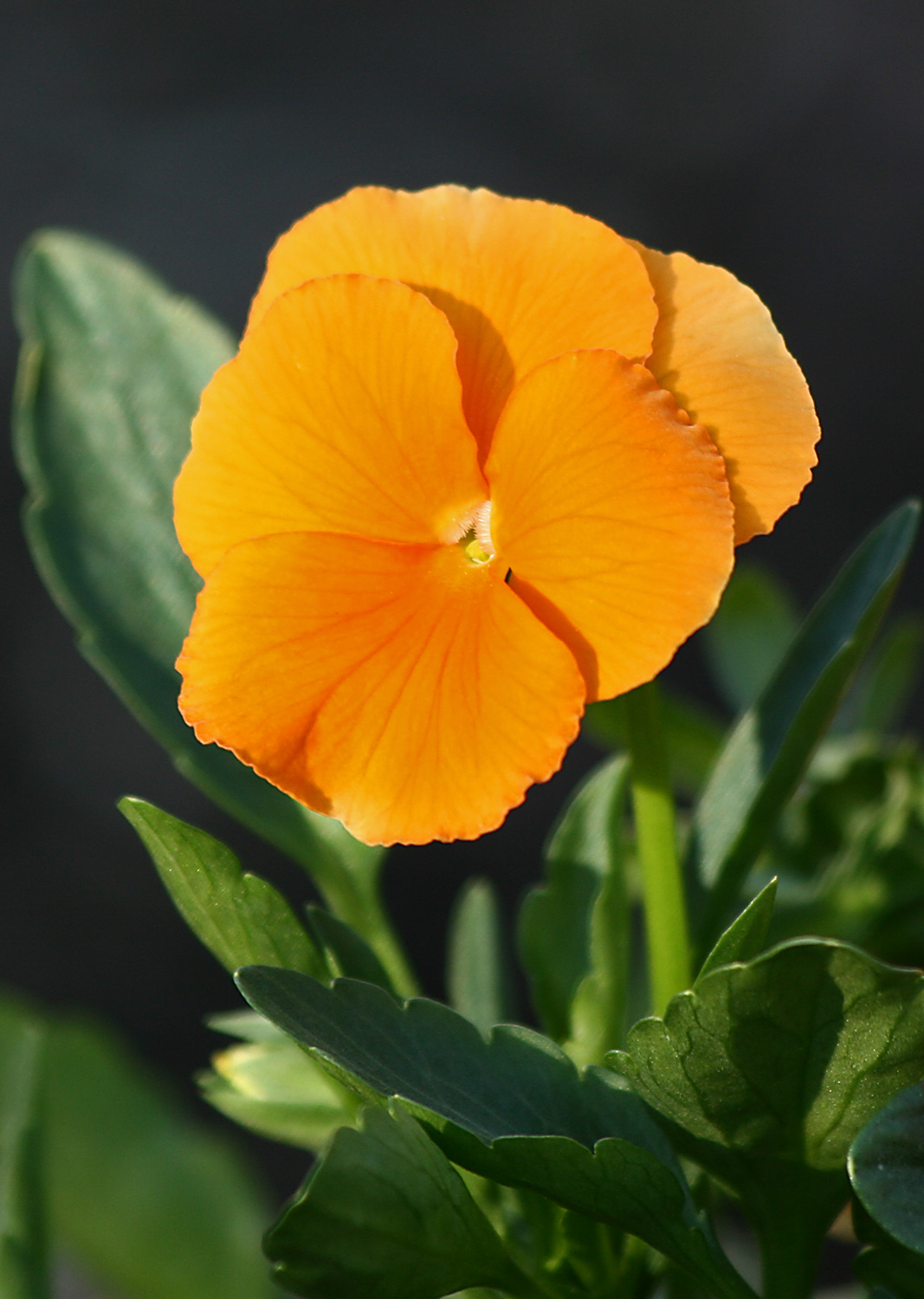
Viola 'Clear Crystals Apricot' The specific epithet may be omitted from a cultivar name.

Every cultivar has a unique name within its denomination class (which is almost always the genus). Names of cultivars are regulated by the International Code of Nomenclature for Cultivated Plants, and may be registered with an International Cultivar Registration Authority (ICRA). There are sometimes separate registration authorities for different plant types such as roses and camellias. In addition, cultivars may be associated with commercial marketing names referred to in the Cultivated Plant Code as "trade designations" (see below).

=== Presenting in text ===
A cultivar name consists of a botanical name (of a genus, species, infraspecific taxon, interspecific hybrid or intergeneric hybrid) followed by a cultivar epithet. The cultivar epithet is enclosed by single quotes; it should not be italicised if the botanical name is italicised; and each of the words within the epithet is capitalised (with some permitted exceptions such as conjunctions). It is permissible to place a cultivar epithet after a common name provided the common name is botanically unambiguous. Cultivar epithets published before 1 January 1959 were often given a Latin form and can be readily confused with the specific epithets in botanical names; after that date, newly coined cultivar epithets must be in a modern vernacular language to distinguish them from botanical epithets.

For example, the full cultivar name of the King Edward potato is Solanum tuberosum 'King Edward'. 'King Edward' is the cultivar epithet, which, according to the Rules of the Cultivated Plant Code, is bounded by single quotation marks. For patented or trademarked plant product lines developed from a given cultivar, the commercial product name is typically indicated by the symbols "TM" or "®", or is presented in capital letters with no quotation marks, following the cultivar name, as in the following example, where "Bloomerang" is the commercial name and 'Penda' is the cultivar epithet: Syringa 'Penda' BLOOMERANG.

Examples of correct text presentation:

Cryptomeria japonica 'Elegans'
Chamaecyparis lawsoniana 'Aureomarginata' (pre-1959 name, Latin in form)
Chamaecyparis lawsoniana 'Golden Wonder' (post-1959 name, English language)
Pinus densiflora 'Akebono' (post-1959 name, Japanese language)
Apple 'Sundown'

Some incorrect text presentation examples:

Cryptomeria japonica "Elegans" (double quotes are unacceptable)
Berberis thunbergii cv. 'Crimson Pygmy' (this once-common usage is now unacceptable, as it is no longer correct to use "cv." in this context; Berberis thunbergii 'Crimson Pygmy' is correct)
Rosa cv. 'Peace' (this is now incorrect for two reasons: firstly, the use of "cv."; secondly, "Peace" is a trade designation or "selling name" for the cultivar R. 'Madame A. Meilland' and should therefore be printed in a different typeface from the rest of the name, without quote marks, for example: Rosa Peace)

Although "cv." has not been permitted by the International Code of Nomenclature for Cultivated Plants since the 1995 edition, it is still widely used and recommended by other authorities.

== Group names ==
Where several very similar cultivars exist they can be associated into a Group (formerly Cultivar-group). As Group names are used with cultivar names it is necessary to understand their way of presentation. Group names are presented in normal type and the first letter of each word capitalised as for cultivars, but they are not placed in single quotes. When used in a name, the first letter of the word "Group" is itself capitalised.

=== Presenting in text ===
Brassica oleracea Capitata Group (the group of cultivars including all typical cabbages)
Brassica oleracea Botrytis Group (the group of cultivars including all typical cauliflowers)
Hydrangea macrophylla Groupe Hortensia (in French)=Hydrangea macrophylla Hortensia Group (in English)

Where cited with a cultivar name the group should be enclosed in parentheses, as follows:

Hydrangea macrophylla (Hortensia Group) 'Ayesha'

== Legal protection of cultivars and their names ==
Since the 1990s there has been an increasing use of legal protection for newly produced cultivars. Plant breeders expect legal protection for the cultivars they produce. According to proponents of such protections, if other growers can immediately propagate and sell these cultivars as soon as they come on the market, the breeder's benefit is largely lost. Legal protection for cultivars is obtained through the use of Plant breeders' rights and plant Patents but the specific legislation and procedures needed to take advantage of this protection vary from country to country.

=== Controversial use of legal protection for cultivars ===
The use of legal protection for cultivars can be controversial, particularly for food crops that are staples in developing countries, or for plants selected from the wild and propagated for sale without any additional breeding work; some people consider this practice unethical.

=== Trade designations and selling names ===
The formal scientific name of a cultivar, like Solanum tuberosum 'King Edward', is a way of uniquely designating a particular kind of plant. This scientific name is in the public domain and cannot be legally protected. Plant retailers may wish to increase their share of the market, and one way of doing this is to replace the Latin scientific names on plant labels in retail outlets with appealing marketing names that are easy to use, pronounce, and remember. Marketing names lie outside the scope of the Cultivated Plant Code which refers to them as "trade designations". If a retailer or wholesaler has the sole legal rights to a marketing name then that may offer a sales advantage. Plants protected by plant breeders' rights (PBR) may have a "true" cultivar name – the accepted scientific name in the public domain – and a "commercial synonym" – an additional marketing name that is legally protected. An example would be Rosa Fascination='Poulmax', in which Rosa is the genus, Fascination is the trade designation, and 'Poulmax' is scientific cultivar name.

Because a name that is attractive in one language may have less appeal in another country, a plant may be given different selling names from country to country. Quoting the original cultivar name allows the correct identification of cultivars around the world.

The main body coordinating plant breeders' rights is the International Union for the Protection of New Varieties of Plants (Union internationale pour la protection des obtentions végétales, UPOV) and this organisation maintains a database of new cultivars protected by PBR in all countries.

== International Cultivar Registration Authorities ==
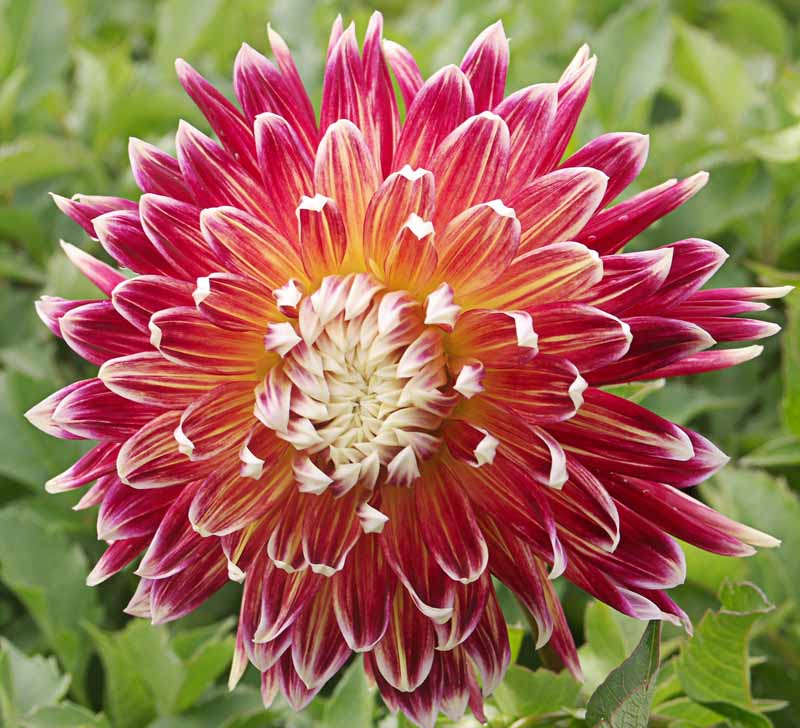
Dahlia 'Akita' A cultivar selected for flower form and colour

An International Cultivar Registration Authority (ICRA) is a voluntary, non-statutory organisation appointed by the Commission for Nomenclature and Cultivar Registration of the International Society of Horticultural Science. ICRAs are generally formed by societies and institutions specializing in particular plant genera such as Dahlia or Rhododendron and are currently located in Europe, North America, China, India, Singapore, Australia, New Zealand, South Africa and Puerto Rico.

Each ICRA produces an annual report and its reappointment is considered every four years. The main task is to maintain a register of the names within the group of interest and where possible this is published and placed in the public domain. One major aim is to prevent the duplication of cultivar and Group epithets within a genus, as well as ensuring that names are in accord with the latest edition of the Cultivated Plant Code. In this way, over the last 50 years or so, ICRAs have contributed to the stability of cultivated plant nomenclature. In recent times many ICRAs have also recorded trade designations and trademarks used in labelling plant material, to avoid confusion with established names.

New names and other relevant data are collected by and submitted to the ICRA and in most cases there is no cost. The ICRA then checks each new epithet to ensure that it has not been used before and that it conforms with the Cultivated Plant Code. Each ICRA also ensures that new names are formally established (i.e. published in hard copy, with a description in a dated publication). They record details about the plant, such as parentage, the names of those concerned with its development and introduction, and a basic description highlighting its distinctive characters. ICRAs are not responsible for assessing the distinctiveness of the plant in question. Most ICRAs can be contacted electronically and many maintain web sites for an up-to-date listing.

== See also ==
- Lists of cultivars
- Plant variety (law)
- Plant Landrace
- Hybrid fruit

== Bibliography ==
- Bailey, Liberty Hyde (1923). "Various cultigens, and transfers in nomenclature". Gentes Herbarum. 1 (Part 3): 113–136.
- Brickell, Chris D. (2009). "International Code of Nomenclature for Cultivated Plants (ICNCP or Cultivated Plant Code) incorporating the Rules and Recommendations for naming plants in cultivation. 8th ed., adopted by the International Union of Biological Sciences International Commission for the Nomenclature of Cultivated Plants" (PDF). Scripta Horticulturae. 10. International Society of Horticultural Science: 1–184. ISBN 978-90-6605-662-6. Archived from the original (PDF) on 2011-08-13.
- Lawrence, George H.M. (1953). "Cultivar, Distinguished from Variety". Baileya. 1: 19–20.
- Lawrence, George H.M. (1955). "The Term and Category of Cultivar". Baileya. 3: 177–181.
- Lawrence, George H.M. (1957). "The Designation of Cultivar-names". Baileya. 5: 162–165.
- Lawrence, George H.M. (1960). "Notes on Cultivar Names". Baileya. 8: 1–4.
- Morton, Alan G. (1981). History of Botanical Science: An Account of the Development of Botany from Ancient Times to the Present Day. London: Academic Press. ISBN 0-12-508382-3.
- Spencer, Roger; Cross, Robert; Lumley, Peter (2007). Plant names: a guide to botanical nomenclature. (3rd ed.). Collingwood, Australia: CSIRO Publishing (also Earthscan, UK.). ISBN 978-0-643-09440-6.
- Spencer, Roger D.; Cross, Robert G. (2007). "The International Code of Botanical Nomenclature (ICBN), the International Code of Nomenclature for Cultivated Plants (ICNCP), and the cultigen". Taxon. 56 (3): 938–940. Bibcode:2007Taxon..56..938S. doi:10.2307/25065875. JSTOR 25065875.
- Trehane, Piers (2004). "50 years of the International Code of Nomenclature for Cultivated Plants". Acta Horticulturae. 634: 17–27. doi:10.17660/ActaHortic.2004.634.1.
