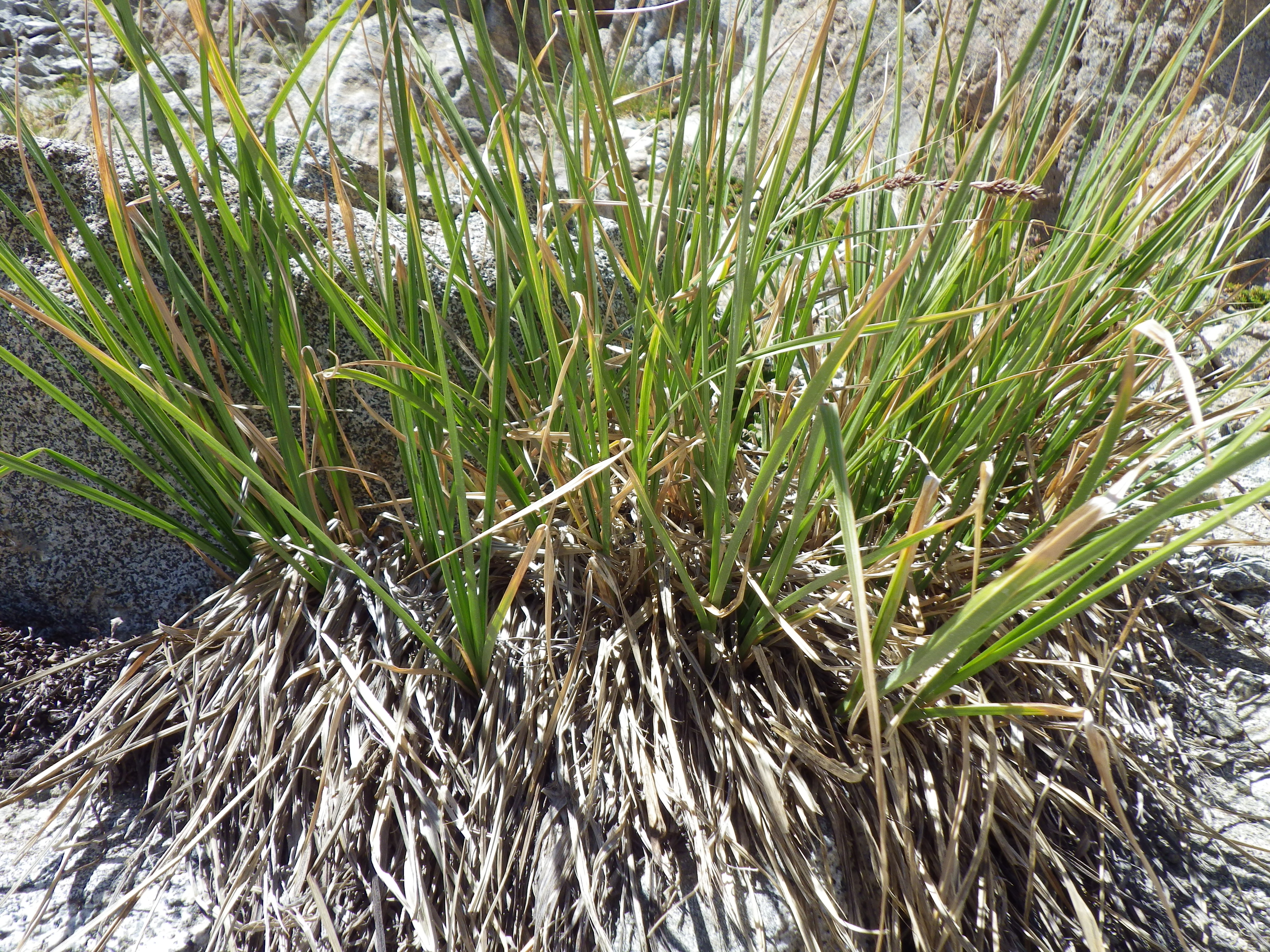

Scientific classification
- Kingdom: Plantae
- Clade: Tracheophytes
- Clade: Angiosperms
- Clade: Monocots
- Clade: Commelinids
- Order: Poales
- Family: Cyperaceae
- Genus: Carex
- Species: C. congdonii

Binomial name
- Carex congdonii L.H.Bailey

= Carex congdonii =

Species of plant

Carex congdonii is a tussock-forming species of perennial sedge in the family Cyperaceae. It is native to parts of California.

The sedge has a turf-like habit with short rhizomes forming many stems. The smooth culms are located centrally and have a triangular cross-section with a length of 30 to 90 cm (12 to 35 in). It has leaves with a reddish colour that are purple tinged basal sheaths. The M-shaped leaves have green blades with a width of 3 to 8 mm (0.12 to 0.31 in) and have 6 to 17 mm (0.24 to 0.67 in) long projections.

== See also ==
- List of Carex species
