= Rubus macvaughii =

Scientific classification
- Kingdom: Plantae
- Clade: Tracheophytes
- Clade: Angiosperms
- Clade: Eudicots
- Clade: Rosids
- Order: Rosales
- Family: Rosaceae
- Genus: Rubus
- Species: R. macvaughii

Binomial name
- Rubus macvaughii L.H. Bailey 1947

Species of fruit and plant

Rubus macvaughii is a rare North American species of brambles in the rose family. It has been found only in Texas in the south-central United States.

The genetics of Rubus is extremely complex, so that it is difficult to decide on which groups should be recognized as species. There are many rare species with limited ranges such as this. Further study is suggested to clarify the taxonomy.
