= Rubus emeritus =

Scientific classification
- Kingdom: Plantae
- Clade: Tracheophytes
- Clade: Angiosperms
- Clade: Eudicots
- Clade: Rosids
- Order: Rosales
- Family: Rosaceae
- Genus: Rubus
- Species: R. emeritus

Binomial name
- Rubus emeritus L.H.Bailey 1941

Species of fruit and plant

Rubus emeritus is a rare North American species of flowering plant in the rose family. It has been found only in the Province of New Brunswick in eastern Canada.

The genetics of Rubus is extremely complex, so that it is difficult to decide on which groups should be recognized as species. There are many rare species with limited ranges such as this. Further study is suggested to clarify the taxonomy.
