= Rubus jaysmithii =

Scientific classification
- Kingdom: Plantae
- Clade: Tracheophytes
- Clade: Angiosperms
- Clade: Eudicots
- Clade: Rosids
- Order: Rosales
- Family: Rosaceae
- Genus: Rubus
- Species: R. jaysmithii

Binomial name
- Rubus jaysmithii L.H.Bailey 1943

Berry and plant

Rubus jaysmithii is a North American species of dewberry in the genus Rubus, a member of the rose family. It is commonly known as Smith's blackberry. Its distribution is confined to the Northeastern United States.
