= Rubus maniseesensis =

Scientific classification
- Kingdom: Plantae
- Clade: Tracheophytes
- Clade: Angiosperms
- Clade: Eudicots
- Clade: Rosids
- Order: Rosales
- Family: Rosaceae
- Genus: Rubus
- Species: R. maniseesensis

Binomial name
- Rubus maniseesensis L.H.Bailey 1947

Species of fruit and plant

Rubus maniseesensis a rare North American species of brambles in the rose family. It has been found only in the State of Rhode Island in the northeastern United States.

The genetics of Rubus is extremely complex, so that it is difficult to decide on which groups should be recognized as species. There are many rare species with limited ranges such as this. Further study is suggested to clarify the taxonomy.
