= Rubus alter =

Scientific classification
- Kingdom: Plantae
- Clade: Tracheophytes
- Clade: Angiosperms
- Clade: Eudicots
- Clade: Rosids
- Order: Rosales
- Family: Rosaceae
- Genus: Rubus
- Species: R. alter

Binomial name
- Rubus alter L.H.Bailey 1941

Species of fruit and plant

Rubus alter, the Maine dewberry, is a North American species of flowering plant in the rose family. It is native to the states of Maine and New Hampshire in the northeastern United States.

The genetics of Rubus is extremely complex, so that it is difficult to decide on which groups should be recognized as species. There are many rare species with limited ranges such as this. Further study is suggested to clarify the taxonomy.
