= Rubus dissimilis =

Scientific classification
- Kingdom: Plantae
- Clade: Tracheophytes
- Clade: Angiosperms
- Clade: Eudicots
- Clade: Rosids
- Order: Rosales
- Family: Rosaceae
- Genus: Rubus
- Species: R. dissimilis

Binomial name
- Rubus dissimilis L.H.Bailey 1941

Synonyms
- Rubus apparatus L.H.Bailey; Rubus perpauper L.H.Bailey

Berry and plant

Rubus dissimilis, the bristly Oswego blackberry, is a rare North American species of flowering plant in the rose family. It grows in scattered locations in the northeastern and north-central United States (Maine, Massachusetts, Connecticut, New York, Pennsylvania, Michigan). Nowhere is it very common.

The genetics of Rubus is extremely complex, so that it is difficult to decide on which groups should be recognized as species. There are many rare species with limited ranges such as this. Further study is suggested to clarify the taxonomy.
