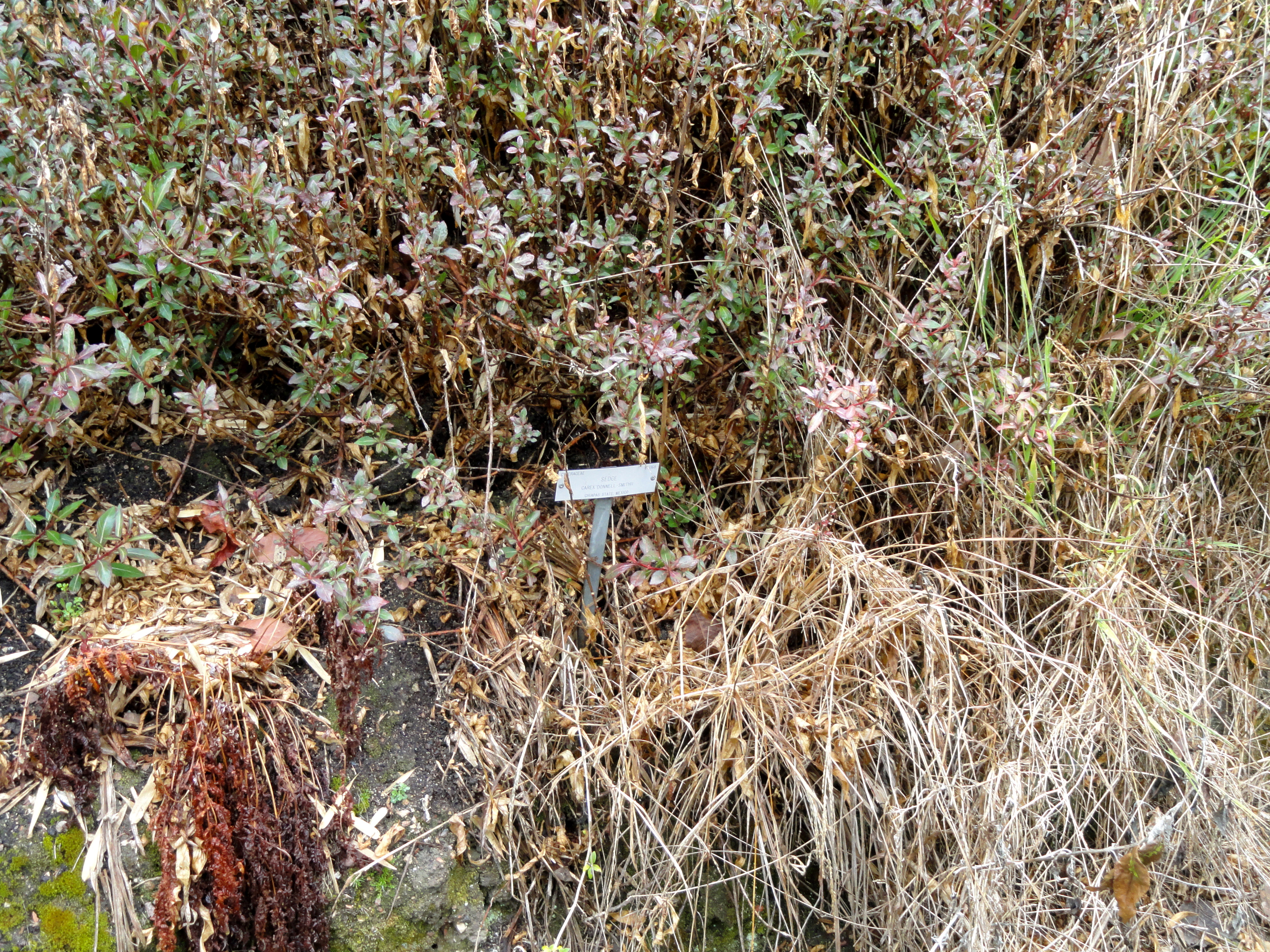

Scientific classification
- Kingdom: Plantae
- Clade: Tracheophytes
- Clade: Angiosperms
- Clade: Monocots
- Clade: Commelinids
- Order: Poales
- Family: Cyperaceae
- Genus: Carex
- Species: C. donnell-smithii

Binomial name
- Carex donnell-smithii L.H.Bailey

= Carex donnell-smithii =

Species of plant

Carex donnell-smithii is a tussock-forming species of perennial sedge in the family Cyperaceae. It is native to parts of Mexico and Central America.

== Description ==
The sedge has stout culms with a length of 30 to 100 cm (12 to 39 in) which have a purple hue toward the base of the plant. It has many stiff, glabrous and leathery leaves with blades that are 3 to 10 mm (0.12 to 0.39 in) wide. The compound inflorescences are 20 to 60 mm (0.79 to 2.36 in) in length that are found in groups in pairs of groups of four.

== Taxonomy ==
The species was first described by the botanist Liberty Hyde Bailey in 1889 as a part of Memoirs of the Torrey Botanical Club. The type specimen was collected in the Alta Verapaz are of Guatemala. It has two synonyms;

- Carex jovis described by Charles Baron Clarke in 1908
- Carex pittieri Johann Otto Boeckeler in 1896.

== Distribution ==
It is found in seasonally dry tropical biome from southern Mexico in the north down through much of Central America to Panama in the south.

== See also ==
- List of Carex species
