= Rubus probativus =

Scientific classification
- Kingdom: Plantae
- Clade: Tracheophytes
- Clade: Angiosperms
- Clade: Eudicots
- Clade: Rosids
- Order: Rosales
- Family: Rosaceae
- Genus: Rubus
- Species: R. probativus

Binomial name
- Rubus probativus L.H.Bailey

Species of fruit and plant

Rubus probativus is an uncommon North American species of brambles in the rose family. It has been found only in the states of Florida, Georgia, and Alabama in the southeastern United States.

The genetics of Rubus is extremely complex, so that it is difficult to decide on which groups should be recognized as species. There are many rare species with limited ranges such as this. Further study is suggested to clarify the taxonomy.
