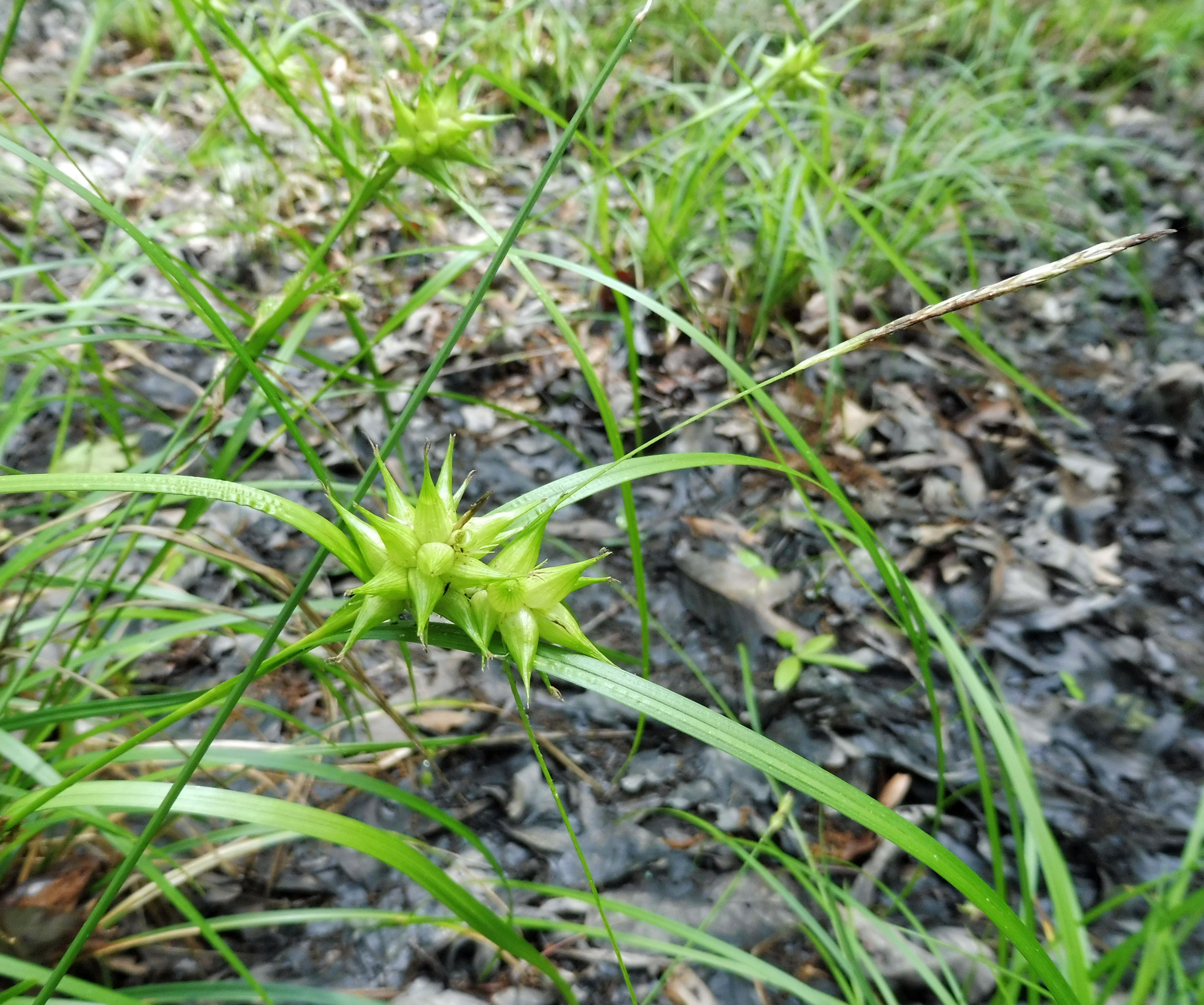
- Showing characteristic long staminate peduncle

Conservation status
- Least Concern (IUCN 3.1)

Scientific classification
- Kingdom: Plantae
- Clade: Tracheophytes
- Clade: Angiosperms
- Clade: Monocots
- Clade: Commelinids
- Order: Poales
- Family: Cyperaceae
- Genus: Carex
- Section: Carex sect. Lupulinae
- Species: C. louisianica

Binomial name
- Carex louisianica L.H.Bailey

= Carex louisianica =

Species of grass-like plant

Carex louisianica, commonly called Louisiana sedge, is a species of flowering plant in the sedge family. It is native to North America, where it is primarily found in the southeastern United States. Its natural habitat is wet, swampy forests and openings.

It is a rhizomatous perennial that flowers in spring. It produces fruits in late spring and summer.
