= Rubus schoolcraftianus =

Scientific classification
- Kingdom: Plantae
- Clade: Tracheophytes
- Clade: Angiosperms
- Clade: Eudicots
- Clade: Rosids
- Order: Rosales
- Family: Rosaceae
- Genus: Rubus
- Species: R. schoolcraftianus

Binomial name
- Rubus schoolcraftianus L.H.Bailey

Species of fruit and plant

Rubus schoolcraftianus is a rare North American species of flowering plants in the rose family. It has been found only in a few locations in Wisconsin and Michigan in the Great Lakes Region of the United States. Nowhere is it very common.

The genetics of Rubus is extremely complex, so that it is difficult to decide on which groups should be recognized as species. There are many rare species with limited ranges such as this. Further study is suggested to clarify the taxonomy.
