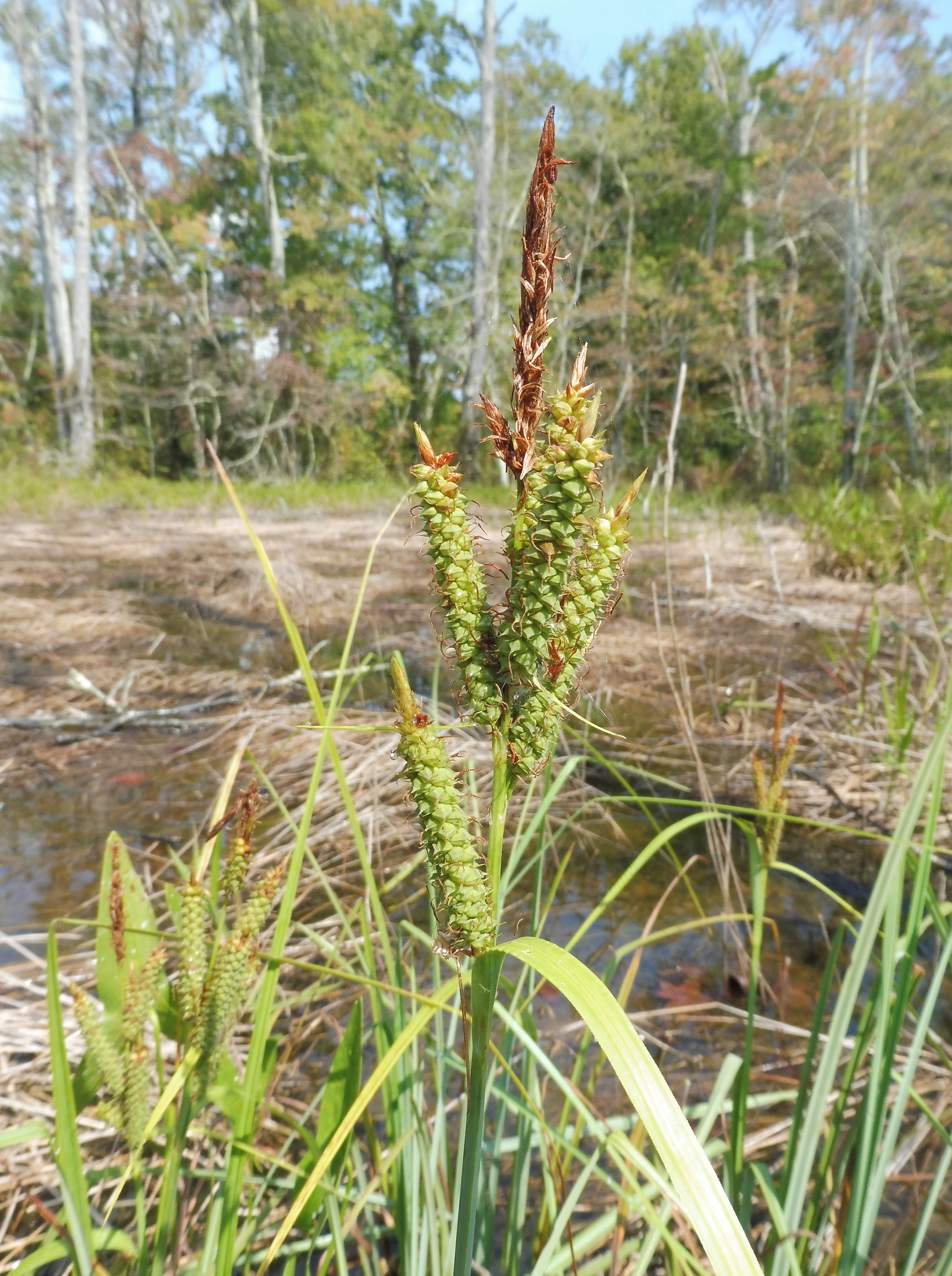

Scientific classification
- Kingdom: Plantae
- Clade: Tracheophytes
- Clade: Angiosperms
- Clade: Monocots
- Clade: Commelinids
- Order: Poales
- Family: Cyperaceae
- Genus: Carex
- Section: Carex sect. Glaucescentes
- Species: C. joorii

Binomial name
- Carex joorii L.H. Bailey

= Carex joorii =

Species of grass-like plant

Carex joorii, commonly called cypress swamp sedge, is a species of flowering plant in the sedge family (Cyperaceae). It is native to the United States, where it is found primarily in the Southeastern region. Its natural habitat is in the shallow water of depression swamps, often growing with Sphagnum moss. It can also be found in bottomland woods, and in wet prairies.

Carex joorii is a perennial graminoid. It produces fruits in the summer through early fall.
