= Rubus felix =

Scientific classification
- Kingdom: Plantae
- Clade: Tracheophytes
- Clade: Angiosperms
- Clade: Eudicots
- Clade: Rosids
- Order: Rosales
- Family: Rosaceae
- Genus: Rubus
- Species: R. felix

Binomial name
- Rubus felix L.H.Bailey 1943

Synonyms
- Rubus dives L.H.Bailey

Berry and plant

Rubus felix, the woodland dewberry, is a rare North American species of flowering plant in the rose family. It has been found in scattered locations in the eastern United States (Massachusetts, Rhode Island, Long Island in New York State, Virginia, West Virginia, and Kentucky).

The genetics of Rubus is extremely complex, so it is difficult to decide on which groups should be recognized as species. There are many rare species with limited ranges such as this. Further study is suggested to clarify the taxonomy.
