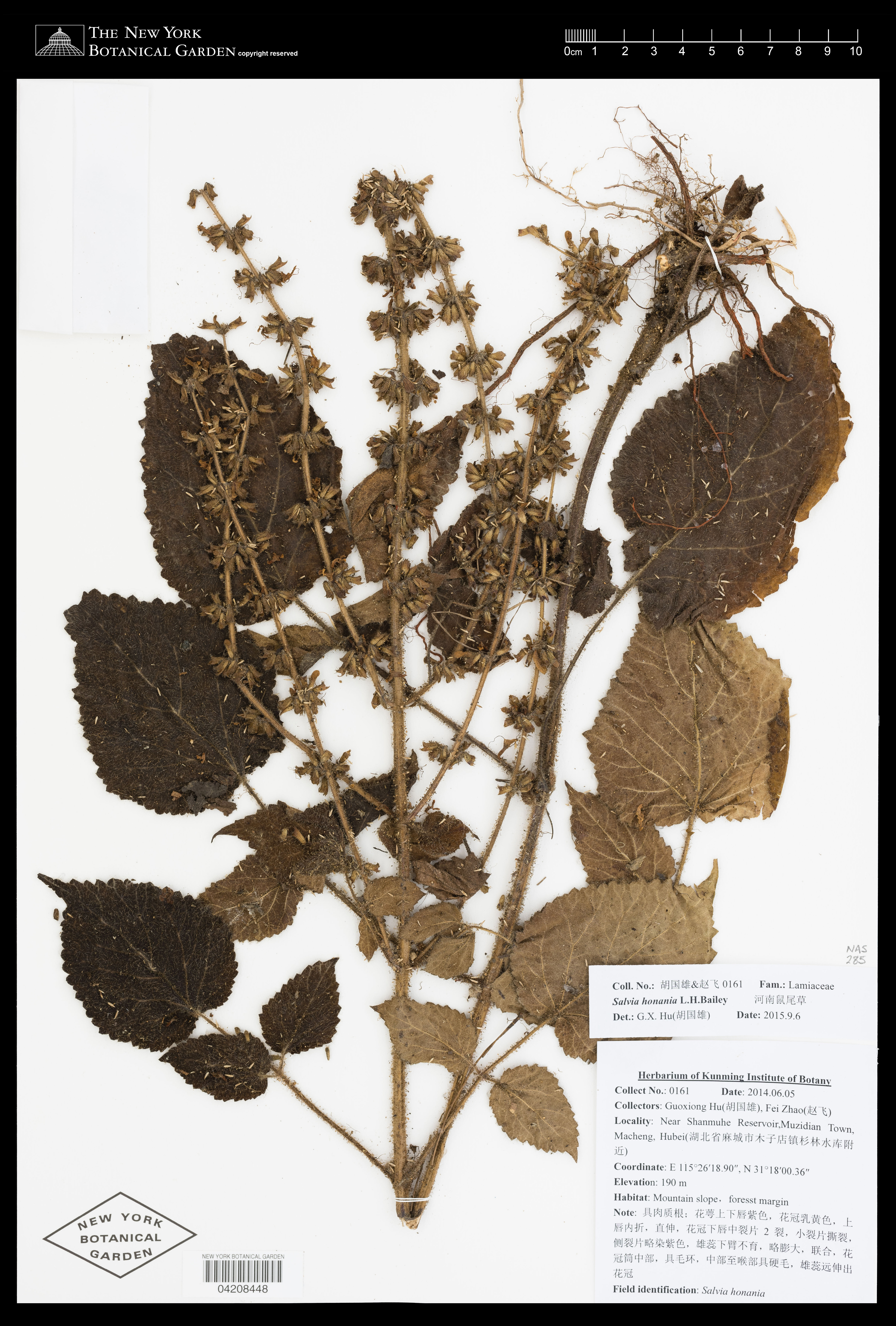

Scientific classification
- Kingdom: Plantae
- Clade: Tracheophytes
- Clade: Angiosperms
- Clade: Eudicots
- Clade: Asterids
- Order: Lamiales
- Family: Lamiaceae
- Genus: Salvia
- Species: S. honania

Binomial name
- Salvia honania L.H.Bailey

= Salvia honania =

Species of flowering plant

Salvia honania (Henan sage) is an annual or biennial plant that is native to fields and wet open areas in Henan and Hubei provinces in China. It grows on erect stems to 40 to 55 cm (16 to 22 in), with simple or 3-foliolate leaves. Inflorescences are widely spaced 5-9 flowered verticillasters in terminal racemes or panicles.
