= Rubus aptatus =

Scientific classification
- Kingdom: Plantae
- Clade: Tracheophytes
- Clade: Angiosperms
- Clade: Eudicots
- Clade: Rosids
- Order: Rosales
- Family: Rosaceae
- Genus: Rubus
- Species: R. aptatus

Binomial name
- Rubus aptatus L.H.Bailey 1943

Berry and plant

Rubus aptatus, the drybank dewberry, is a rare North American species of flowering plant in the rose family. It is found in scattered locations in the northeastern United States (Massachusetts, Connecticut, New York, New Jersey).

The genetics of Rubus is extremely complex, so that it is difficult to decide on which groups should be recognized as species. There are many rare species with limited ranges such as this. Further study is suggested to clarify the taxonomy.
