= Rubus deamii =

Scientific classification
- Kingdom: Plantae
- Clade: Tracheophytes
- Clade: Angiosperms
- Clade: Eudicots
- Clade: Rosids
- Order: Rosales
- Family: Rosaceae
- Genus: Rubus
- Species: R. deamii

Binomial name
- Rubus deamii L.H.Bailey 1932

Synonyms
- Rubus gordonii L.H.Bailey; Rubus rosagnetis L.H.Bailey

Berry and plant

Rubus deamii, known as Deam's dewberry, is a North American species of dewberry in section Procumbentes (formerly Flagellares) of the genus Rubus, a member of the rose family. It grows in scattered locations in the east-central United States and southern Canada, from Ontario south to Missouri, Tennessee, and West Virginia, but nowhere is it very common. It was first identified in 1932 by Liberty Hyde Bailey and Sister Rose Agnes Greenwell, and Bailey named it Rubus rosagnetis in her honor.
