= Ethel Zoe Bailey =

American botanist (1889-1983)

- Born: November 17, 1889; Ithaca, New York, U.S.
- Died: 1983 (aged 93–94)
- Education: Smith College (B.A.)
- Known for: Curating Bailey Hortorium at Cornell University, compiling large seed and nursery catalogue
- Parent: Liberty Hyde Bailey
- Awards: George Robert White Medal, 1967, Smith College Medal, 1970
- Scientific career
- Fields: Botany, zoology
- Workplaces: Cornell University

Ethel Zoe Bailey (1889-1983) was a U.S. botanist and the first curator of the Bailey Hortorium at Cornell University from 1935 to 1957. She created the Ethel Z. Bailey Horticultural Catalogue Collection and in 1912 was the first woman in Ithaca, New York to earn a driver's license.

== Early life and education ==
Ethel Zoe Bailey was born on November 17, 1889 to her mother and father, botanist Liberty Hyde Bailey. She graduated from Smith College in 1911 with her bachelor's degree in zoology, and afterward worked at Cornell University alongside her father, editing several of his publications, including Standard Cyclopedia of Horticulture and Manual of Cultivated Plants.

== Career ==
Bailey traveled to countries including Venezuela and Trinidad on research excursions with her father. She co-authored two reference books with her father, including Hortus and Hortus Second, the latter of which published in 1969. After her father's death, Bailey revised and oversaw the publication of a third and updated volume, Hortus Third, with the staff of the Liberty Hyde Bailey Hortorium in 1975.

Bailey worked at Cornell University's Liberty Hyde Bailey Hortorium as the institution's first curator from 1935 to 1957. She retired from Cornell in 1957, but continued to volunteer at the Hortorium until her death in 1983. In order to transport herself to and from the Hortorium, Bailey earned her driver's license in 1912, and was the first woman in Ithaca, New York to do so.

While at Cornell, Bailey contributed to Standard Cyclopedia of Horticulture and the Manual of Cultivated Plants and edited the first eight volumes of the academic journal, Gentes Herbarum. She also compiled and indexed botanical samples from different countries. This catalogue of samples, now called the Ethel Z. Bailey Horticultural Catalogue Collection, is on display at Cornell.

Bailey is buried at Lake View Cemetery in Ithaca, New York.

The standard author abbreviation E.Z.Bailey is used to indicate this person as the author when citing a botanical name.
