= Rose Agnes Greenwell =

American nun and botanist (1894–1982)

Sister Rose Agnes Greenwell SCN PhD

Personal life
- Born: January 8, 1894 Leonardtown, Maryland, US
- Died: September 3, 1982 (aged 88) Louisville, Kentucky, US

Religious life
- Religion: Catholic

Rose Agnes Greenwell (January 8, 1894 – September 3, 1982) was an American Catholic nun and botanist. In 1932 she collected the holotype of Eupatorium resinosum var. kentuckiense, which the Southern Appalachian Botanical Society reported was the only known specimen of its type. With Liberty Hyde Bailey she discovered a Kentucky dewberry that he named Rubus rosagnetis in her honor.

== Early life and education ==
She graduated from St. Mary's Academy in 1913 and then went to Notre Dame for an AB, graduating in 1926. She earned a master's in science from Marquette University in 1927. Her 1935 doctoral dissertation from the Catholic University of America in botany and biology was The Flora of Nelson County, Kentucky with a Selected list of Economically Important Plants, the first of its kind in that state in the 20th century, under the direction of the Rev. Hugh O'Neill. She published her dissertation as a book with Nazareth College that same year. Then she served on the faculty at Nazareth College (now Spalding University), becoming the head of the department of biology.
