= Indigen =

In general usage the word indigen is treated as a variant of the word indigene, meaning a native.

== Usage in botany ==
However, it was used in a strictly botanical sense for the first time in 1918 by Liberty Hyde Bailey ((1858–1954) an American horticulturist, botanist and cofounder of the American Society for Horticultural Science) and described as a plant

" of known habitat ".

Later, in 1923, Bailey formally defined the indigen as:

=== Botanical definition ===
" ... a species of which we know the nativity, - one that is somewhere recorded as indigenous. "

The term was coined to contrast with cultigen which he defined in the 1923 paper as:

" ... the species, or its equivalent, that has appeared under domestication, – the plant is cultigenous."

== See also ==
- Cultigen
- Alien (biology)
- Native
- Naturalization (biology)
