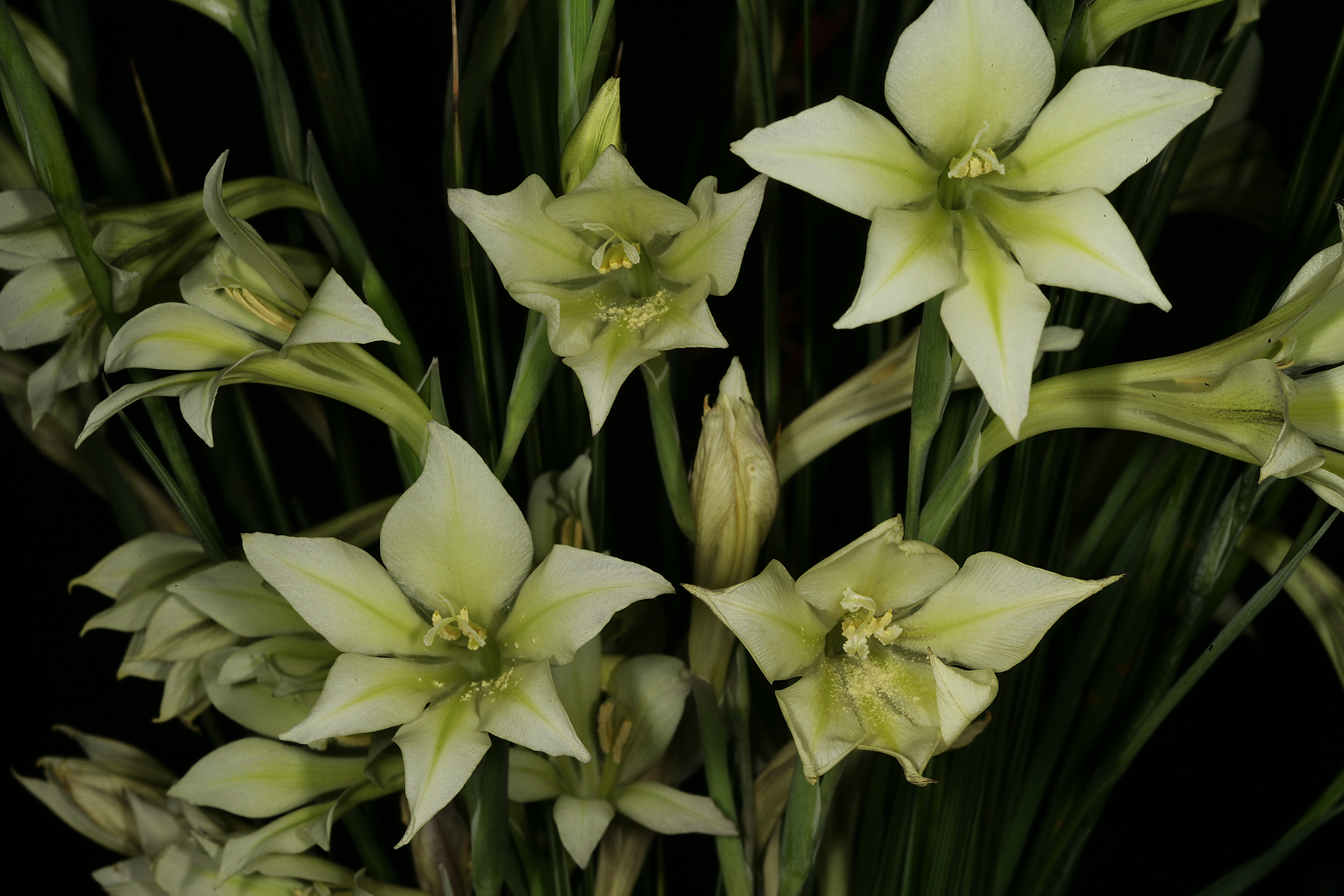

Scientific classification
- Kingdom: Plantae
- Clade: Tracheophytes
- Clade: Angiosperms
- Clade: Monocots
- Order: Asparagales
- Family: Iridaceae
- Genus: Gladiolus
- Species: G. tristis

Binomial name
- Gladiolus tristis L.

= Gladiolus tristis =

Species of flowering plant

Gladiolus tristis is a species of gladiolus known by several common names, including ever-flowering gladiolus and marsh Afrikaner. It is native to southern Africa, especially South Africa. It is known in parts of Australia and coastal California as an introduced species. It is sometimes grown as a garden plant. This gladiolus typically grows one half to one metre in height, but has been known to approach 1.5 metres tall. It grows from a corm one or two centimetres wide. It produces three narrow, sheathing leaves. The inflorescence is a spike of two to eight large, fragrant blooms. Each flower has six white or cream tepals with greenish or purplish midlines. The flowers are said to have a scent similar to carnations and cloves. Not all individuals possess scent because the allele for its presence is recessive in relation to the allele for its absence.
