= Cultigen =

Plant that is the result of artificial selection

A cultigen (from Latin cultus 'cultivated' and gens 'kind'), or cultivated plant, (Note: This is a scientific term defined by the ICNCP, not literally a plant in cultivation.) is a plant that has been deliberately altered or selected by humans, by means of genetic modification, graft-chimaeras, plant breeding, or wild or cultivated plant selection. These plants have commercial value in horticulture, agriculture and forestry. Plants meeting this definition remain cultigens whether they are naturalised, deliberately planted in the wild, or grown in cultivation.

== Naming ==
The traditional method of scientific naming is under the International Code of Nomenclature for algae, fungi, and plants, and many of the most important cultigens, like maize (Zea mays) and banana (Musa acuminata), are named. The items in the list can be in any rank. It is more common currently for cultigens to be given names in accordance with the International Code of Nomenclature for Cultivated Plants (ICNCP) principles, rules and recommendations, which provide for the names of cultigens in three categories: the cultivar, the Group (formerly the cultivar-group), and the grex. (Note: The category grex was added in the 2009 Cultivated Plant Code and applies only to orchids (Article 4).) The ICNCP does not recognize the use of trade designations and other marketing devices as scientifically acceptable names; it does provide advice on how they should be presented.

Not all cultigens have been given names according to the ICNCP. Apart from ancient cultigens, there may be occasional anthropogenic plants, such as those that are the result of breeding, selection, and tissue grafting, that are considered of no commercial value and have therefore not been given names according to the ICNCP.

== Origin of term ==
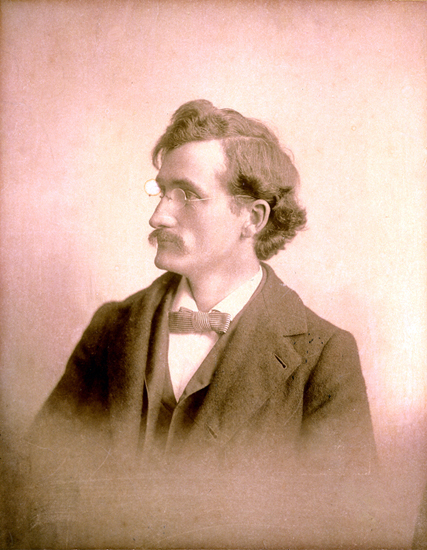
Liberty Hyde Bailey 1858–1954, who coined the word cultigen in 1918

The word cultigen was coined in 1918 by Liberty Hyde Bailey (1858–1954), an American horticulturist, botanist and cofounder of the American Society for Horticultural Science. He created the term from the thought of a need for special categories for cultivated plants that had arisen by intentional human activity and which would not fit neatly into the Linnaean hierarchical classification of ranks used by the International Rules of Botanical Nomenclature (which later became the International Code of Nomenclature for algae, fungi, and plants).

In his 1918 paper, Bailey noted that for anyone preparing a descriptive account of the cultivated plants of a region (he was at that time preparing such an account for North America), it would be clear that there are two gentes or kinds (Latin singular gens, plural gentes) of plants. Firstly, he referred to those that are of known origin or nativity "of known habitat" as indigens; the other kind was "a domesticated group of which the origin may be unknown or indefinite, which has such characters as to separate it from known indigens, and which is probably not represented by any type specimen or exact description, having, therefore, no clear taxonomic beginning".

He called this second kind of plant a cultigen; the word was thought to be derived from the combination of the Latin cultus ('cultivated') and gens ('kind'). In 1923, Bailey emphasised that he was dealing with plants at the rank of species, referring to indigens as those that are discovered in the wild and cultigens as plants that arise in some way under the hand of man. He then defined a cultigen as a species, or its equivalent, that has appeared under domestication. Bailey soon altered his 1923 definition of cultigen when, in 1924, he gave a new definition in the Glossary of his Manual of Cultivated Plants as:

Plant or group known only in cultivation; presumably originating under domestication; contrast with indigen

=== Cultivars ===
The 1924 definition of the cultigen permits the recognition of cultivars; the 1923 definition restricts the idea of the cultigen to plants at the rank of species. In later publications of the Liberty Hyde Bailey Hortorium, Cornell, the idea of the cultigen having the rank of species returned (e.g., Hortus Second in 1941 and Hortus Third in 1976). Both of these publications indicate that the terms cultigen and cultivar are not synonymous and that cultigens exist at the rank of species only.

A cultigen is a plant or group of apparent specific rank, known only in cultivation, with no determined nativity, presumably having originated, in the form in which we know it, under domestication. Compare indigen. Examples are Cucurbita maxima, Phaseolus vulgaris, Zea mays.

Botanical historian Alan Morton thought that wild and cultivated plants (cultigens) were of interest to the ancient Greek botanists (partly for religious reasons) and that the distinction was discussed in some detail by Theophrastus, the "Father of Botany". Theophrastus accepted the view that it was human action, not divine intervention, that produced cultivated plants (cultigens) from wild plants, and he also "had an inkling of the limits of culturally induced (phenotypic) changes and of the importance of genetic constitution" (Historia Plantarum III, 2,2 and Causa Plantarum I, 9,3). He also states that cultivated varieties of fruit trees would degenerate if cultivated from seed.

In his 1923 paper, Bailey established a new category for the cultivar. Bailey was never explicit about the etymology of the word cultivar; it has been suggested that it is a contraction of the words cultigen or cultivated and variety. He defined cultivar in his 1923 paper as:

a race subordinate to species, that has originated and persisted under cultivation; it is not necessarily, however, referable to a recognised botanical species. It is essentially the equivalent of the botanical variety except in respect to its origin

== Usage ==
=== In botany ===
In botanical literature, the word cultigen is generally used to denote a plant that, like the bread wheat (Triticum aestivum), is of unknown origin or presumed to be an ancient human selection. Plants like bread wheat have been given binomials according to the Botanical Code and therefore have names with the same form as those of plant species that occur naturally in the wild, but it is not necessary for a cultigen to have a species name or to have the biological characteristics that distinguish a species. Cultigens can have names at any of various other ranks, including cultivar names, names in the categories of grex and group, variety names, and forma names, or they may be plants that have been altered by humans (including genetically modified plants) but which have not been given formal names.

=== In horticulture ===
In 1918, L.H. Bailey distinguished native plants from those originating in cultivation by designating the former as indigens (indigenous or native to the region) and the latter as cultigens. At the same time, he proposed the term cultivar to distinguish varieties originating in cultivation from botanical varieties known first in the wild. In 1953, the first International Code of Nomenclature for Cultivated Plants was published, in which Bailey's term cultivar was introduced. In the same year, the eponymous journal commemorating the work of Bailey (who died in 1954), Baileya, was published. In the first volume of Baileya George Lawrence, taxonomist and colleague of Bailey, wrote a short article on the distinction between the new terms cultivar and variety, and to clarify the term taxon, which had been introduced by German biologist Meyer in the 1920s. He opens the article:

In horticulture, the definitions and uses of the terms cultigen and cultivar have varied, and a wider use of the term cultigen has been proposed. The definition given in the Botanical Glossary of The New Royal Horticultural Society Dictionary of Gardening defines a cultigen as "a plant found only in cultivation or in the wild having escaped from cultivation; included here are many hybrids and cultivars". The Cultivated Plant Code states that cultigens are "maintained as recognisable entities solely by continued propagation" and thus would not include plants that have evolved after escape from cultivation.

Recent usage in horticulture has maintained a distinction between cultigen and cultivar while allowing the inclusion of cultivars within the definition of cultigen. Cultigen is a general-purpose term encompassing plants with cultivar names and others as well, while cultivar is a formal category in the ICNCP. The definition refers to a "deliberate" (long-term propagation) selection of particular plant characteristics that are not exhibited by a plant's wild counterparts. Occasionally, cultigens escape from cultivation and go into the wild, where they breed with indigenous plants. Selections may be made from the progeny in the wild and brought back into cultivation where they are used for breeding, and the results of the breeding again escape into the wild to breed with indigenous plants; an example of this is the plant Lantana.

== See also ==
- Domestication of plants
- Human impact on the environment
- Indigen
- Liberty Hyde Bailey
- Artificial selection
- Binomial nomenclature
- Cultivar
- Cultivated plant taxonomy
