= Liberty Hyde Bailey =

U.S. botanist (1858–1954)

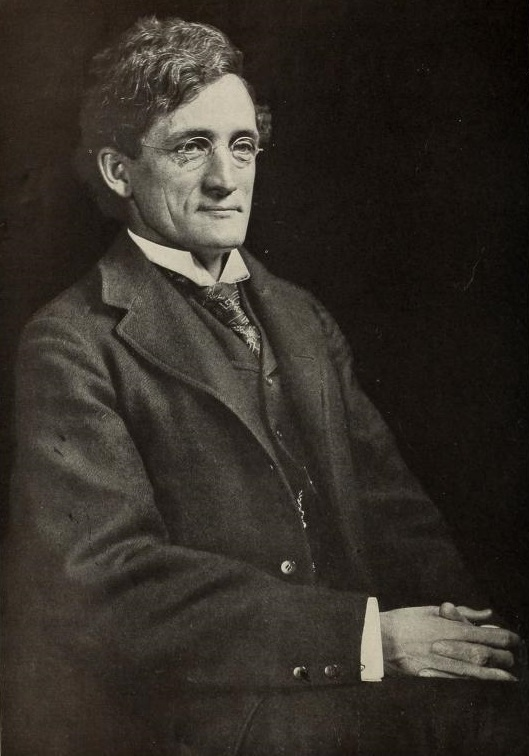
- Born: March 15, 1858; South Haven, Michigan, U.S.
- Died: December 25, 1954 (aged 96); Ithaca, New York, U.S.
- Education: Michigan Agricultural College (now Michigan State University)
- Awards: Veitch Memorial Medal (1897)
- Scientific career
- Fields: Botany
- Workplaces: Michigan State University, Cornell University
- Author abbrev. (botany): L.H.Bailey

Liberty Hyde Bailey (March 15, 1858 – December 25, 1954) was an American horticulturist and advocate for rural reform in the United States. He was cofounder of the American Society for Horticultural Science. During the Progressive Era, Bailey was instrumental in establishing the Cooperative Extension System, 4-H youth development programs, the nature study movement, parcel post, and rural electrification.^{:44} In 1903, Bailey founded the New York State College of Agriculture at Cornell University and served as its first dean until 1913. Bailey's work was influential in defining rural sociology as a distinct and valuable field of study in the United States.

== Biography ==
Born in South Haven, Michigan, as the third son of farmers Liberty Hyde Bailey Sr. and Sarah Harrison Bailey. In 1876, Bailey met Lucy Millington who encouraged his interest in botany and mentored him. Bailey entered the Michigan Agricultural College (MAC, now Michigan State University) in 1877 and graduated in 1882 (he had taken a year off from study for health reasons). The next year, he became assistant to the renowned botanist Asa Gray, of Harvard University. This was arranged by a professor at MAC, William James Beal. Bailey spent two years with Gray as his herbarium assistant. The same year, he married Annette Smith, the daughter of a Michigan cattle breeder, whom he met at the Michigan Agricultural College. They had two daughters, Sara May, born in 1887, and Ethel Zoe, born in 1889.

In 1884 Bailey returned to MAC to become professor and chair of the Horticulture and Landscape Gardening Department, establishing the first horticulture department in the country.

In 1888, he moved to Cornell University in Ithaca, New York, where he assumed the chair of Practical and Experimental Horticulture. In 1896, he was elected to the American Philosophical Society. He was elected an Associate Fellow of the American Academy of Arts and Sciences in 1900. He founded the College of Agriculture, and in 1904 he was able to secure public funding. He was dean of what was then known as New York State College of Agriculture from 1903 to 1913. In 1908, he was appointed Chairman of The National Commission on Country Life by president Theodore Roosevelt. Its 1909 Report called for rebuilding a great agricultural civilization in America. In 1913, he retired to become a private scholar and devote more time to social and political issues. In 1917 he was elected a member of the United States National Academy of Sciences.

He edited The Cyclopedia of American Agriculture (1907–09), the Cyclopedia of American Horticulture (1900–02) (continued as the Standard Cyclopedia Of Horticulture (1916–1919)) and the Rural Science, Rural Textbook, Gardencraft, and Young Folks Library series of manuals. He was the founding editor of the journals Country Life in America and the Cornell Countryman. He dominated the field of horticultural literature, writing some sixty-five books, which together sold more than a million copies, including scientific works, efforts to explain botany to laypeople, a collection of poetry; edited more than a hundred books by other authors and published at least 1,300 articles and over 100 papers in pure taxonomy.

He coined the words cultivar, cultigen, and indigen. His most significant and lasting contributions were in the botanical study of cultivated plants. Bailey's publisher was George Platt Brett, Sr. of Macmillan Publishers (United States).

== Death ==
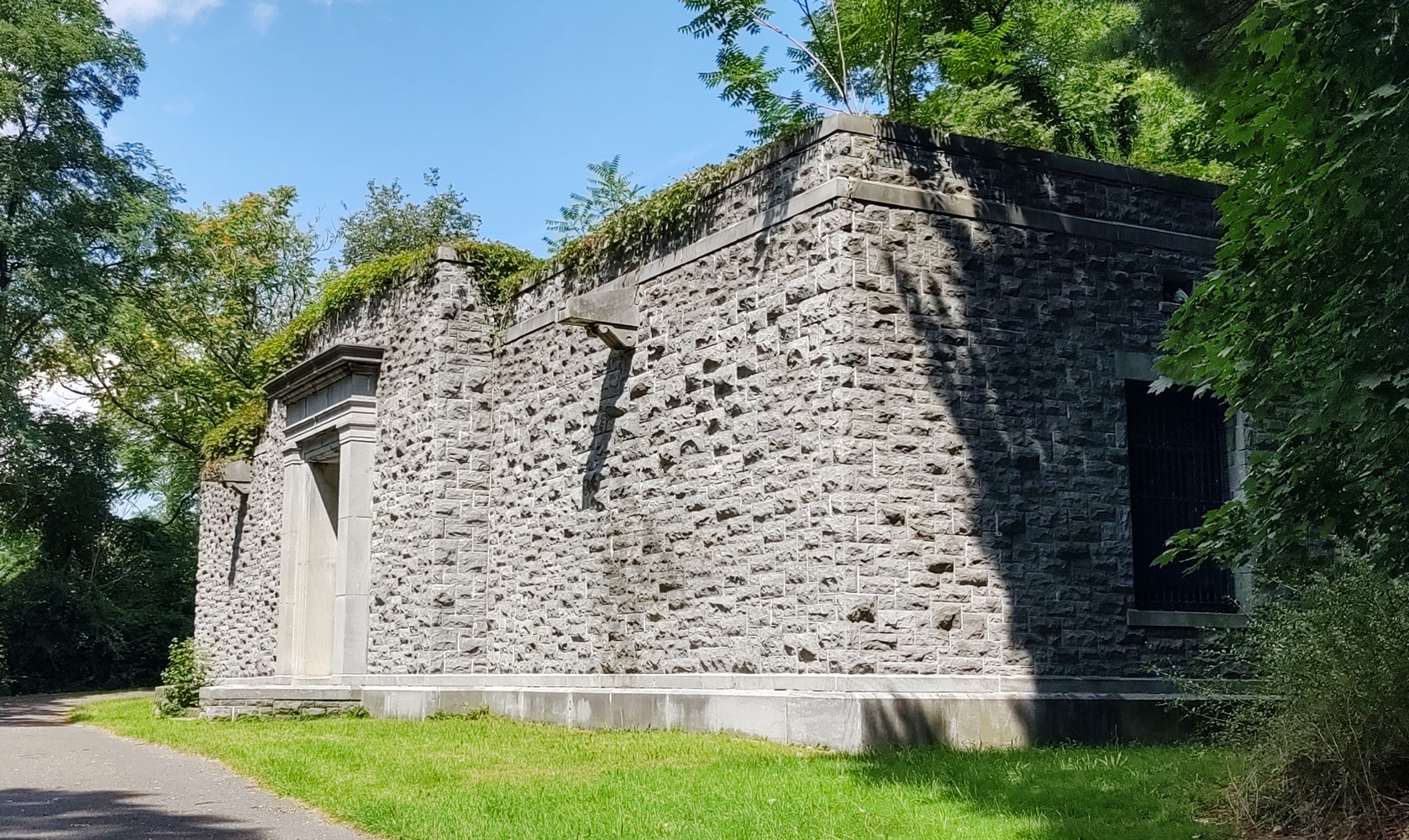
Liberty Hyde Bailey designed mausoleum at Lake View Cemetery, Ithaca, New York.

Bailey and his family are interred in a grand Egyptian Revival styled mausoleum of his own design at Lake View Cemetery in Ithaca, New York.

== Rediscovery of Gregor Mendel's work ==
Bailey was one of the first to recognize the overall importance of Gregor Mendel's work. He cited Mendel's 1865 and 1869 papers in the bibliography that accompanied his 1892 paper, "Cross Breeding and Hybridizing". Mendel is mentioned again in the 1895 edition of Bailey's "Plant Breeding".

== Agrarian ideology ==
Bailey represented an agrarianism that stood in the tradition of Thomas Jefferson. He had a vision of suffusing all higher education, including horticulture, with a spirit of public work and integrating "expert knowledge" into a broader context of democratic community action. As a leader of the Country Life Movement, he strove to preserve the American rural civilization, which he thought was a vital and wholesome alternative to the impersonal and corrupting city life. In contrast to other progressive thinkers at the time, he endorsed the family, which, he recognized, played a unique role in socialization. Especially the family farm had a benign influence as a natural cooperative unit where everybody had real duties and responsibilities. The independence it fostered made farmers "a natural correction against organization men, habitual reformers, and extremists". It was necessary to uphold fertility in order to maintain the welfare of future generations.

According to Bailey, the American rural population, however, was backward, ignorant and saddled with inadequate institutions. The key to his reform program was guidance by an educated elite toward a new social order. The Extension System was partly pioneered by Bailey. The grander design of a new rural social structure needed a philosophical vision that could inspire and motivate. Bailey proposed a Society of the Holy Earth in his book, The Holy Earth (1915). He envisioned farmers and others rising to the task of stewardship of the land, forests, oceans and all creation. The Holy Earth has been recognized as an early text of ecological theology.

According to Allan C. Carlson, Bailey's real legacy was the themes and direction that he gave the new agrarian movement, ideas very different from previous agrarian thought. He saw technological innovation as friendly to the family farm and inevitably resulting in decentralization. He was scornful of the actual forms of peasant life and wanted to transform it by cutting the farmers loose from "the slavery of old restraints". Parochial and communal social groups should be broken down and replaced by "inter–neighborhood" and "inter–community" groups, while new leaders would be called in "who will promote inclusive rather than exclusive sociability." Bailey and his followers held a quasi–religious faith in education by enlightened experts, which meant suppression of inherited ways and substitution by progressive ways. It was accompanied by a corresponding hostility to traditional religion.

Bailey's simultaneous embrace of the rural civilization and of technological progress had been based on a denial of the possibility of overproduction of farm products. When that became a reality in the 1920s, he turned to a "new economics" that would give farmers special treatment. Finally, after desperately toying with Communism, he had to choose between fewer farmers and farm families and restraint on technology or production. He chose to preserve technology rather than the family farms. After this, he retreated from the Country Life movement into scientific study.

Bailey's influence on modern American Agrarianism remains determinative. The inherent contradictions of his ideas have been equally persistent: the tension between real farmers and rural people and the Country Life campaign; difficulties to understand the operative economic forces; the reliance on state schools to safeguard family farms; and hostility to traditional Christian faith.

== Palm studies ==
Bailey made significant contributions to the taxonomic study of palms. His interest in the plants reportedly stemmed from his inability to answer his wife's questions about the plants during a family trip to Jamaica in 1910. After retiring as dean of the Cornell University College of Agriculture and Life Sciences in 1913, he devoted the better part of three decades to finding, collecting, and writing about palms. He developed a detailed method of collecting palm specimens that included photographing the tree in its entirety, preserving flowers and fruits in alcohol, pressing flower clusters, and carefully folding sections of the leaves to fit herbarium sheets.

Bailey traveled extensively in search of palms and other plants. In the 1920s, he was often accompanied by his daughter and scientific collaborator, Ethel Zoe Bailey. Already in his fifties when he began studying palms, Bailey continued to collect into his 90s. He was frequently abroad on his birthday, March 15. Thus, he could recall spending his 79th in Port-au-Prince, Haiti, his 82nd in Oaxaca, Mexico, his 88th in Trinidad, his 90th in Grenada, and his 91st at sea on a small sailboat between Sint Eustatius and Saint Kitts. Friends and colleagues at Cornell hoped to hold a 90th birthday celebration for Bailey, and they did, but only after their guest of honor returned to Ithaca in May.

When Bailey began studying palms, about 700 species had been identified. The number reached thousand by 1946, the rise due in large part to his intensive study of the family. Ill health finally forced Bailey to discontinue collecting abroad in 1949, at the age of 91. He continued to study, compare, and write about his palm specimens. His ultimate goal was to produce an authoritative guide to all palms, titled Genera Palmarum. When he died, he left behind a manuscript of the first page of the introduction. Genera Palmarum was ultimately published by Drs. Natalie Uhl and John Dransfield in 1987. A second, expanded, edition was released in 2008.

== The Country Life Commission ==
Liberty Hyde Bailey is widely regarded as a key leader in the Country Life Movement. In the early 1900s, rural communities in the United States were facing many challenges. Rural areas lacked opportunities for economic growth, struggled to adopt new technological advancements, and were navigating significant labor shortages following the Civil War. Poor conditions in rural America caused many residents of rural communities to relocate to urban areas. This trend had troubling implications for the U.S. economy, as its success was dependent upon a strong agricultural industry.

In 1908, President Theodore Roosevelt established a Commission on Country Life to investigate possible solutions to promote the revitalization of rural communities. He appointed Bailey to serve as the chair of the commission. The Commission conducted thirty public hearings with citizens across the country, distributed over 500,000 surveys about rural life, and organized community meetings to hear citizens’ perspectives on rural issues.

The Commissions’ report was first published in 1911 and reissued in 1944. The commission made three key recommendations. First, they called for the establishment of a nationwide agricultural extension network. Second, they encouraged continued data collection in rural communities to assist in the creation of collegiate programs in rural sociology and agricultural economics. Third, they called upon the federal government to implement a larger nationwide campaign for rural improvement.

Regarding Bailey's service to the Country Life Commission, President Roosevelt Wrote: “I wish I could write at length upon the admirable work that Director Bailey did as chairman of the Country Life Commission… [N]o man in our country did better work for the country than he did on that commission.”

== Legacy ==
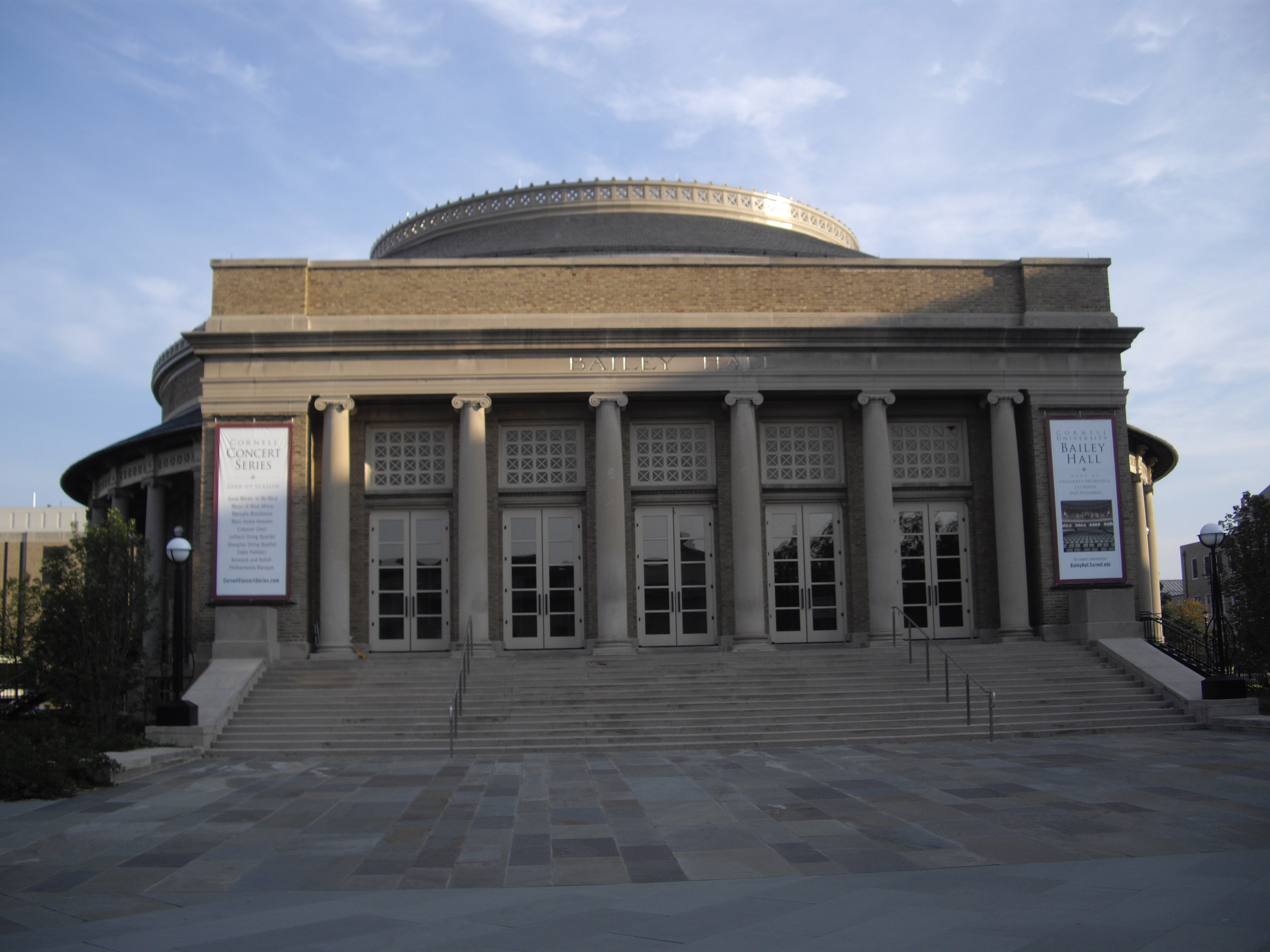
Bailey Hall at Cornell University

Cornell has memorialized Bailey by dedicating Bailey Hall in his honor, as well as the LH Bailey Hortorium and Herbarium, a named professorship, and the Baileya journal. The Herbarium houses many of his palm collections, as well as an assortment of photos, a portrait, and several of his personal items including his desk. Since 1958 the American Horticultural Society has issued the annual Liberty Hyde Bailey Award. A residence hall in Brody Complex at Michigan State University, and an elementary school in East Lansing, Michigan, were also named after him.

Bailey was awarded the Veitch Memorial Medal of the Royal Horticultural Society in 1897.

In 1928, a tree (Sterculia foetida) dedicated to Bailey was planted at the University of Hawaiʻi at Mānoa Campus Arboretum, and is now listed there as an Exceptional Tree.

About 140 years after his birth, the Liberty Hyde Bailey Scholars Program was created at Michigan State University, the institution of higher learning where Bailey was both educated and began his career. The Bailey Scholars Program incorporates L.H. Bailey's love of learning and expressive learning styles to provide a space for students to become educated in fields that interest them.

The Liberty Hyde Bailey Birthplace is listed on the National Register of Historic Places.

With Rose Agnes Greenwell, Bailey discovered a Kentucky berry plant that he named Rubus rosagnetis in her honor.

== Selected works ==
Books

- Talks Afield About Plants and the Science of Plants (1885)
- Field Notes on Apple Culture (1886)
- The Nursery-Book: A Complete Guide to the Multiplication and Pollination of Plants (1891)
- American grape training: An account of the leading forms now in use of training the American grapes (1893)
- The Survival of the Unlike (1896)
- The Forcing-Book (1897)
- The Principles of Fruit-Growing (1897)
- The Nursery Book (1897)
- Plant-Breeding (1897)
- The Pruning Manual (1898)
- Sketch of the Evolution of our Native Fruits (1898)
- Principles of Agriculture (1898)
- Bailey, L.H., ed. (1906) [1900]. Cyclopedia of American Horticulture. Volume 1 A-D, Volume 2 E–M, Volume 3 N–Q, Volume 4 R–Z (5th ed.). New York: Macmillan.
  - First Edition, 1900
  - subsequently "rewritten, enlarged and reset" in 1914 as:
  - Bailey, L.H., ed. (1919) [1914]. The standard cyclopedia of horticulture; a discussion, for the amateur, and the professional and commercial grower, of the kinds, characteristics and methods of cultivation of the species of plants grown in the regions of the United States and Canada for ornament, for fancy, for fruit and for vegetables; with keys to the natural families and genera, descriptions of the horticultural capabilities of the states and provinces and dependent islands, and sketches of eminent horticulturists (6 vols.) (3rd. ed.). New York: Macmillan.
    - Second Edition, 1914, reprinted 1917
- The Principles of Vegetable Gardening (1901)
- The Nature-Study Idea (1903)
- The Practical Garden-Book (1903)
- The Outlook to Nature (1905)
- The State and the Farmer (1908)
- The Training of Farmers (1909)
- Animal biology; Human biology. Parts II & III of First course in biology with W.M. Coleman (1910)
- Manual of Gardening (1910)
- Bailey, Liberty Hyde (1910). Cyclopedia of American agriculture. Volume 2 -- Crops.
- Manual of Gardening (Second Edition) (1910)
- The Country-Life Movement in the United States (1911)
- The Practical Garden Book (1913)
- The Holy Earth (1915)
- Wind and Weather (Poetry) (1916)
- Universal Service (1918)
- What is Democracy? (1918)
- Beginners' Botany (1921)
- The Apple-Tree (1922)
- The Seven Stars (1923)
- The Harvest: Of the Year to the Tiller of the Soil (1927)
- The Garden Lover (1928)
- The Horticulturist's Rule-Book
- Farm and Garden Rule-Book
- How Plants get Their Names
- Manual of Cultivated Plants. (1st ed. 1924, Revised ed. 1949) New York: Macmillan

Articles

- Bailey, L.H. - Canna x generalis. Hortus, 118 (1930); cf. Standley & Steyerm. in Fieldiana, Bot., xxiv. III.204 (1952).
- Bailey, L.H. - Canna x orchiodes. Gentes Herb. (Ithaca), 1 (3): 120 (1923).

== See also ==
- Country life movement
- Category:Taxa named by Liberty Hyde Bailey
