= Tongva Sacred Springs =

- Koruu'vanga (Tongva)
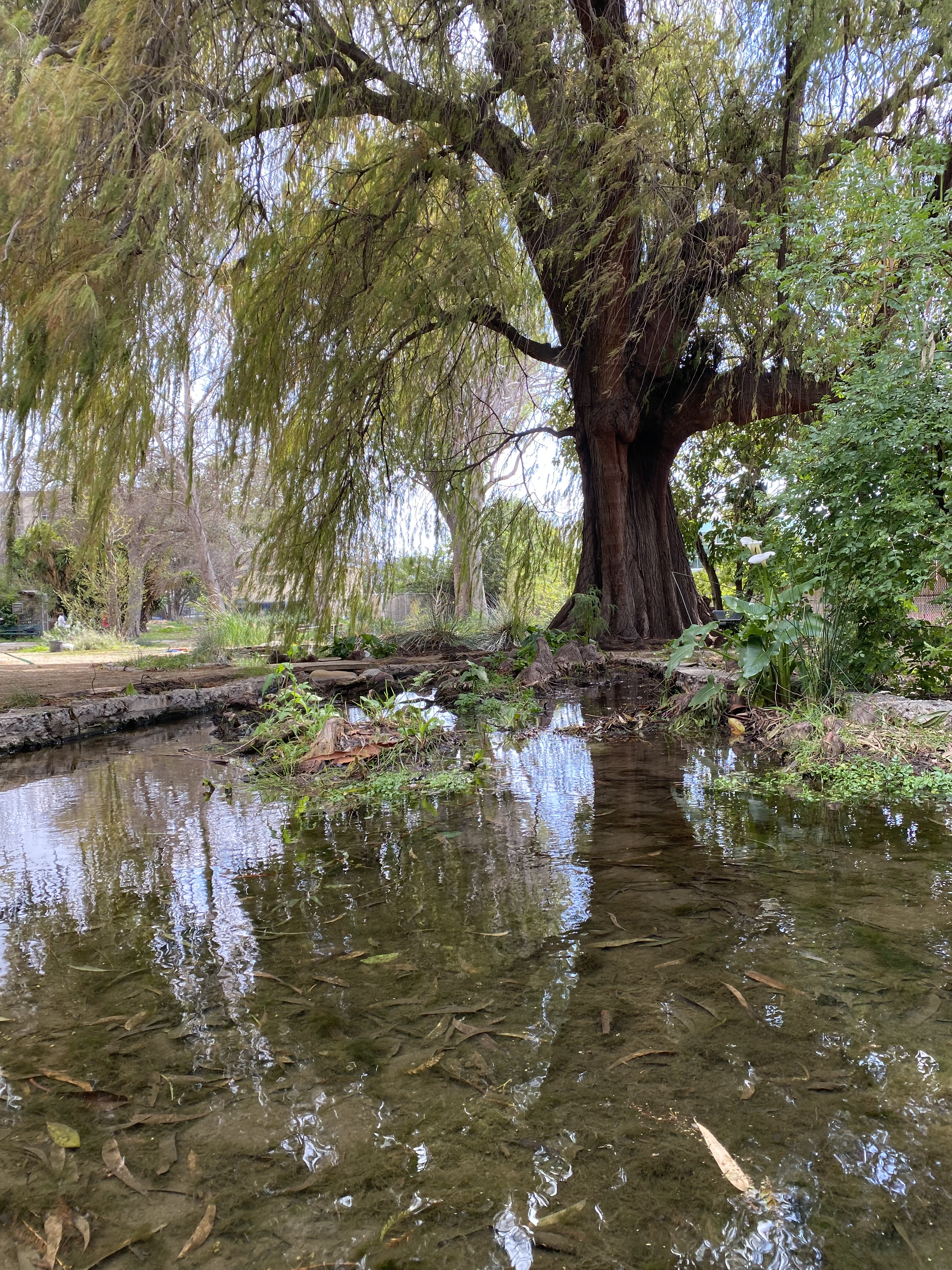
- Interactive map of Tongva Sacred Springs
- 34.0456°N 118.461°W
- Location: University High School, Los Angeles

California Historical Landmark
- Reference no.: 522

The Tongva Sacred Springs are a group of springs located on the campus of University High School in Los Angeles, California. The springs, called Koruu'vanga by the native Gabrieleno Tongva people, were used as a source of natural fresh water by the Tongva people since at least the 5th century BC and continue to produce 22,000–25,000 US gallons (83,000–95,000 L) of water a day. The springs are also sometimes referred to as the Gabrieleno-Tongva Springs, the Tongva Holy Springs, and the Sacred Springs. (The deprecated toponym Serra Springs was for Catholic missionary Junípero Serra who supposedly said mass at the site in 1770.)

The springs are found at two separate locations on the campus. The larger group of springs is closed off from the rest of the campus and is under the care of the Gabrielino/Tongva Springs Foundation. For many years this area was referred to as the "horticultural" or "agricultural area" of the campus. This group includes an "80 sq ft (7.4 m^{2}) lagoon". The other spring "feeds into a charming man-made waterfall" at the northeastern edge of the upper athletic field. A third spring was located farther north, near Texas Avenue, but it ceased to flow during the 1940s when a local water company began drawing from the aquifer. Water from all of the extant springs drains into the Santa Monica Bay.

VIDEO: Spring vent at the sandy bottom of one of the Tongva springs

== History ==
The name Kuruvungna, which means "a place where we are in the sun", comes from the name of a village that was located at the site of the springs. The Portolá Expedition of 1769, one of the two expeditions that led to the founding of Los Angeles, camped at that village, while traveling along the route that would become known as El Camino Real. The Tongva gave them watercress, pashí (chia) and fresh water from the spring.

The Tongva were described in an unpublished diary of Juan Crespí, who traveled with the Portolá Expedition of 1769:

... as we arrived and set up camp, six very friendly, compliant tractable heathens came over, who had their little houses roofed with grass, the first we have been seeing of this sort. Three of them came wearing a great deal of paint; all of them, however, unarmed. They brought four or six bowls of usual seeds and good sage which they presented to our captain; on me they bestowed a good sized string of the sort of beads that they all have, made of white sea shells and red ones (though not very bright colored) that look to be coral, though of a very inferior sort.

The name Serra comes from Junípero Serra, the founder of the Alta California mission chain, who is reported to have said mass there.

Crespí renamed the springs "San Gregorio" while visiting the Tongva village at the springs with the Portola Expedition in 1769, but the expedition soldiers called them "El Berrendo" after wounding a deer there. Later, around the turn of the 19th century, the two springs began to be called "The Tears of Santa Monica" because they brought to mind the weeping eyes of the saint as she cried for her erring son. "Santa Monica", as an official place name, was first recorded in 1827 on a grazing permit, next in 1828 when the Rancho Boca de Santa Monica was granted to Marques and Reyes.

Later, in 1839, the name was used again for Rancho San Vicente y Santa Monica when it was granted to Sepulveda and Machado. Kuruvungna Springs was included in this rancho, the first time it had been "owned" by anyone other than the indigenous inhabitants. Jose Delores Sepulveda, one of the sons of the rancho's owner, lived in the Sepulveda adobe which once stood on the high ground near Bundy Ave and Wilshire Blvd overlooking the Kuruvungna village site and the springs.

The city of Santa Monica, as well as the canyon, ranchos, bay, mountains, boulevard, airport, and freeway, therefore all take their name from this former turn-of-the-19th-century name for Kuruvungna Springs.

In the 1800s, the spring served as the water supply for the city of Santa Monica.

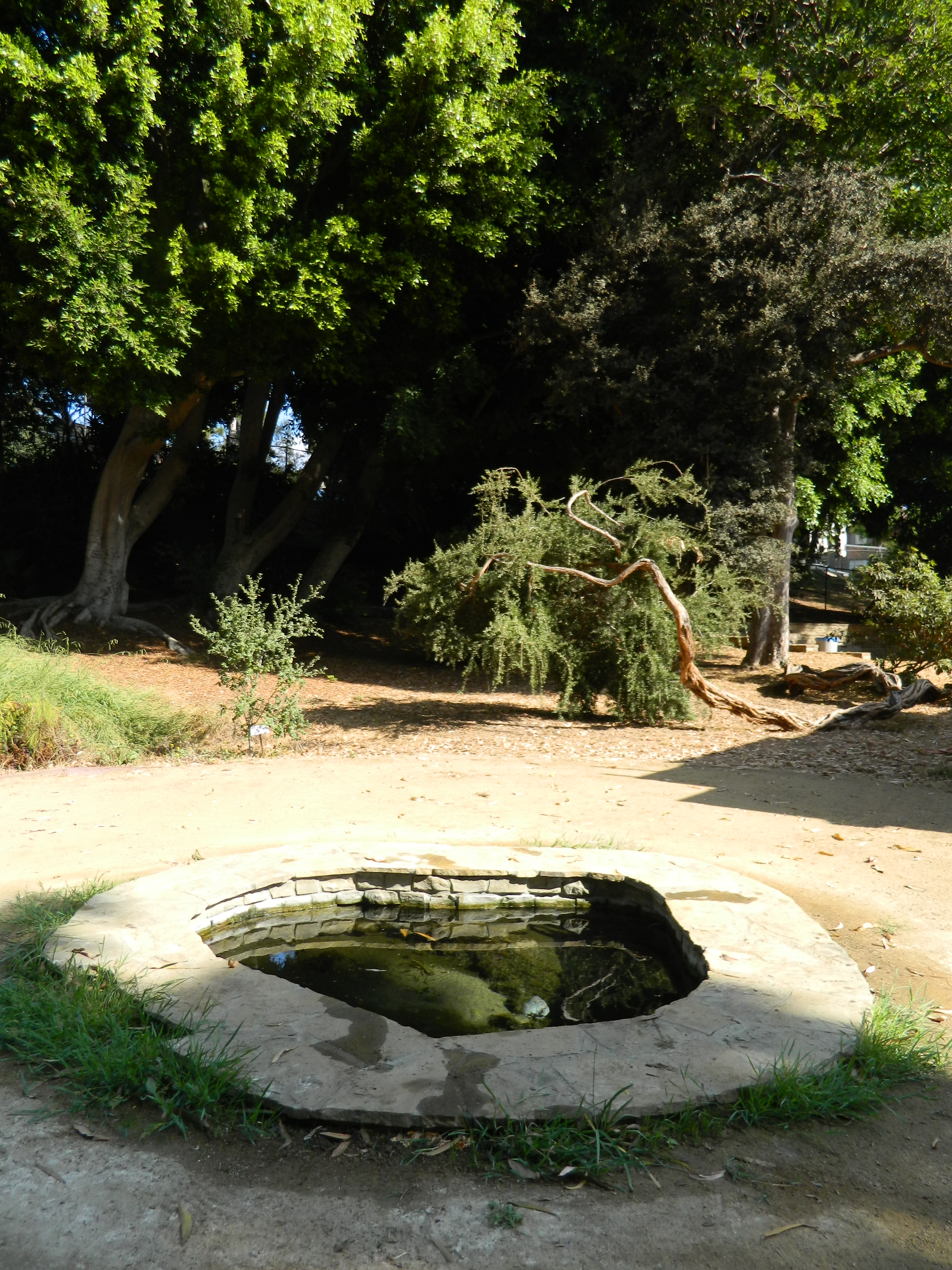
The smallest of the Springs bubbling from underground

== University High School ==
Shortly after the annexation of Sawtelle, construction began at the springs to build Warren G. Harding High School, later renamed University High School. Construction at the school in 1925 unearthed evidence of an Indian village. The springs were landscaped to make them a feature of the campus. The waters of the upper spring were made to cascade down a small waterfall (still extant) and also fill a wishing well (demolished).

The source of the lower springs was left open, as it still is, so one could see the water bubbling up through the sand. The overflow fills a large pond with a small island before being directed into a storm drain. The pond was surrounded with manicured lawns and served as a gathering place for students and the setting for group graduation photos. However, the springs corner of the campus fell into disrepair in the 1980s and began to be used as a dump. After the Gabrielino Tongva Springs Foundation removed tons of trash from the site in the 1990s, the area around the springs was planted with tule reeds and other native plants.

In 1975, a grave containing a small skeleton and soapstone bowls was discovered by students and a science teacher from what archaeologists now believe to be a burial site.

In 1980 Indian Springs Continuation High School, which is housed on the part of the campus where the springs are, was opened.

In 1992, developers proposed an underground parking lot one block north of the springs which would have cut off the spring's water. In response, tribal descendants, community members and teachers and students from the school founded a non-profit foundation, the Gabrielino/Tongva Springs Foundation, and after a two-year fight, the proposed parking structure was voted down.

The foundation currently leases the site from the Los Angeles Unified School District in order to use the location for their monthly ceremony and guided tours, and received a $7,000 grant from Los Angeles' Environmental Affairs Department to enhance the area with different types of trees, vines and herbs.

In 1992, the newly established Gabrieleno Springs Foundation held the first annual Life Before Columbus Day event. The event takes place just before Columbus Day every year and celebrates the history of the land and of the Tongva people. Previous events have drawn more than 600 people, including Native Americans from various tribes, local politicians, community members and students and faculty from the school. The event includes tours of the Kuruvunga Village site and springs, performances by dancers from the Tongva and Aztec tribe and storytelling from the Chumash tribe. There are also hands-on activities like corn-doll making, rock painting, and tortilla making, offered by authentic Native American vendors.

In 1998, Governor Pete Wilson signed senate bill SB 1956. The Bill, introduced by Senator Tom Hayden, required the California Department of Parks and Recreation to, "seek to establish a permanent cultural and ecological site at the Gabrielino/Tongva Springs", and called for the creation of a task force created by University High School's administration, "in consultation with the Gabrielino/Tongva Springs Foundation and the Los Angeles Unified School District". The bill appropriated $50,000 to the department to be spent on a local assistance grant to the task force, "to plan for the preservation of the Gabrielino/Tongva Springs, and property adjacent thereto...in order to enhance environmental, cultural, and educational opportunities."

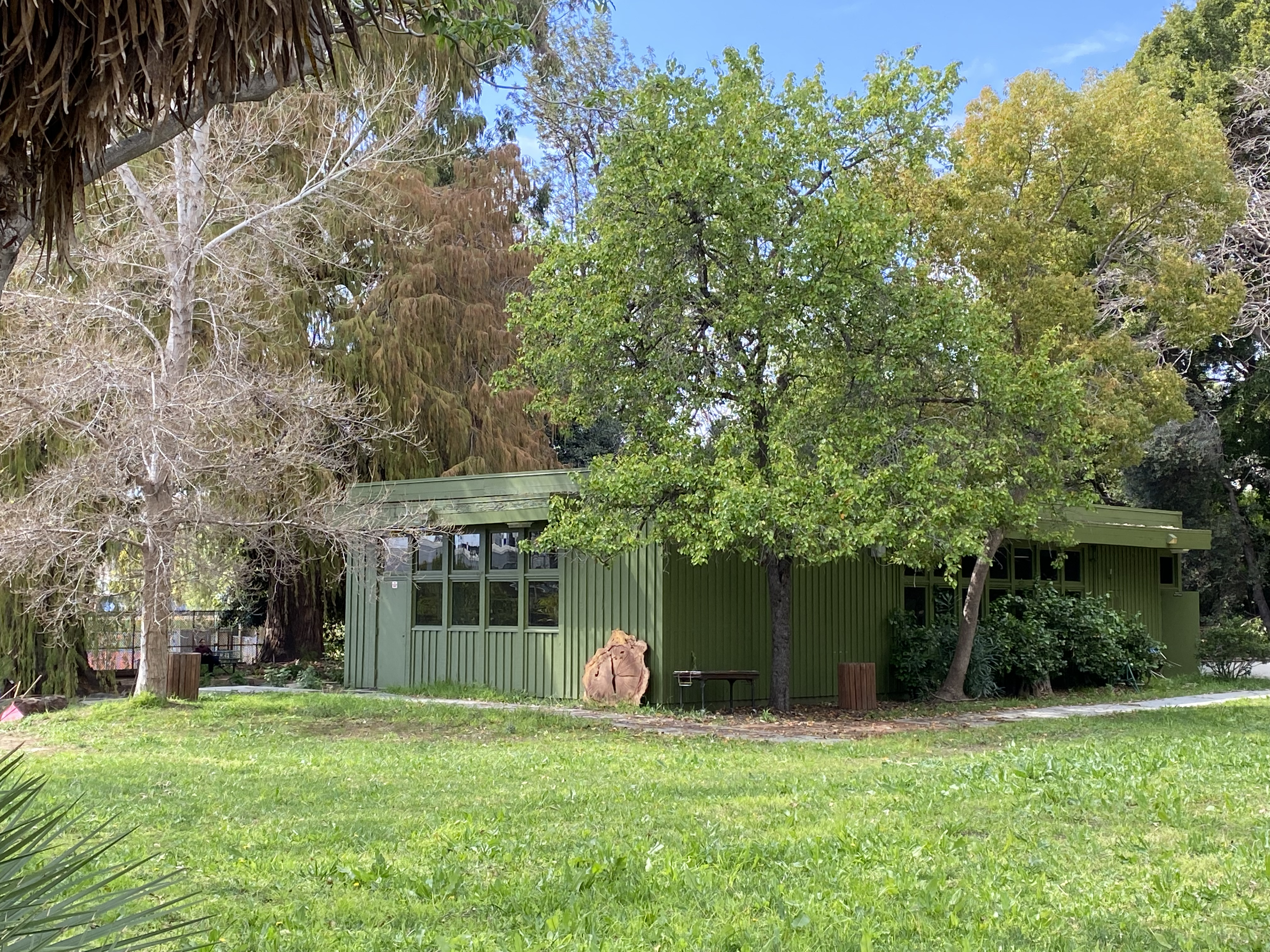
Kuruvunga Cultural Center and Museum building

== California Historical Landmark ==
The marker at the site reads:

NO. 522 SERRA SPRINGS - The Portolá Expedition of 1769 encamped at this spring, and it is reported that in 1770 Father Serra said Mass here to the Indians of this area. This spring was also the former water supply of the town of Santa Monica. The site is now the campus of the University High School.

The springs have a UCLA Archaeological designation of CA-LAN-382. They are designated by California Historical Landmark #522.

== See also ==
- Encino Hot Springs
- Tongva people
- Population of Native California
- Native Americans in the United States
