= Gulf of Salerno =

Gulf in Salerno, Campania, Italy

Coordinates: 40°31′N 14°42′E

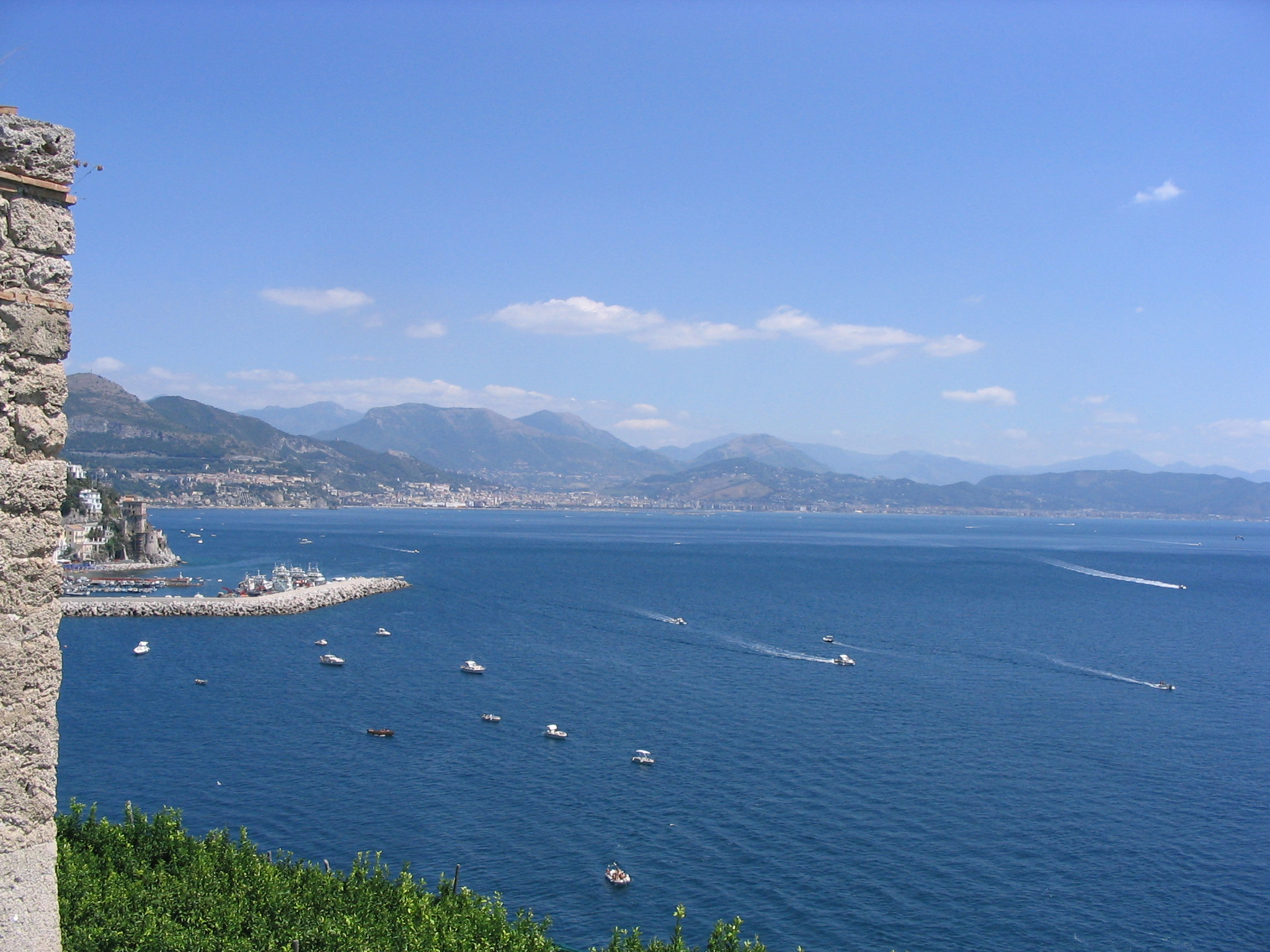
The Gulf of Salerno seen from the Amalfi Coast.

The Gulf of Salerno (Italian: Golfo di Salerno; Salerno dialect: Gulf i Saliern), also referred to as the Bay of Salerno, is a coastline along the Tyrrhenian Sea, which entirely faces the province of Salerno (in the region of Campania, Southern Italy).

The northern part of this coast is the Costiera Amalfitana, which ends at Punta Campanella and includes towns like Amalfi, Maiori, Positano and the city of Salerno itself. The gulf also borders Piana del Sele to the east and the Cilento coast, which ends at Punta Licosa, to the south. The distance from Punta Campanella to Punta Licosa is approximately 61 km (38 miles). The surface of the gulf, delimited by the imaginary line that connects Punta Campanella to Punta Licosa and by the coast, is approximately 2,450 km2.

The Gulf of Salerno is separated from the Gulf of Naples (on the north) by the Amalfi Peninsula. In the north, the gulf coast, also called the Divina Costiera due to its beauty, is rugged by the rocky slopes of the Lattari Mountains falling into the sea. To the east, the coastline of the Sele plain is low and sandy and partly covered by pine forests.

== History ==
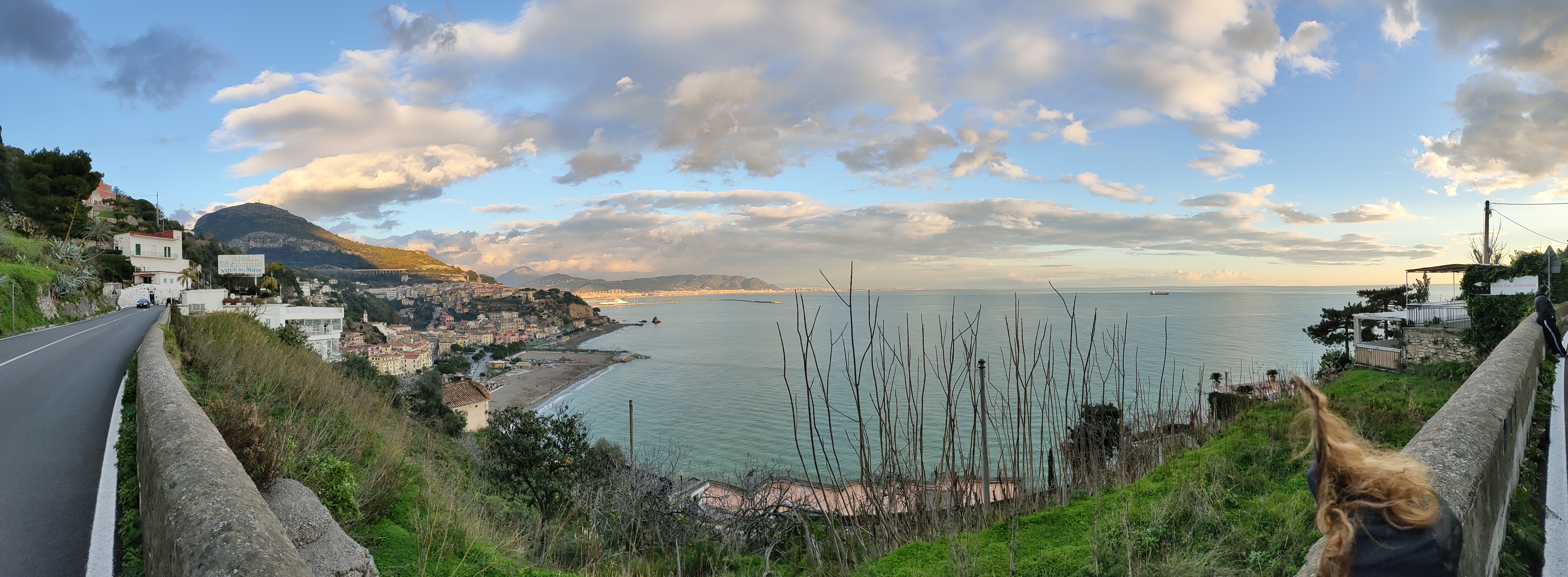
View of Gulf of salerno from Vietri

1. Ancient History: The Gulf of Salerno was inhabited by ancient Italic tribes long before the rise of the Roman Empire. The foundation of Poseidonia (later Paestum) dates back to this era. The original nucleus of Salerno itself was founded by the Etruscan in the 3nd century BC and the city progressively played a significant role in the region's history.

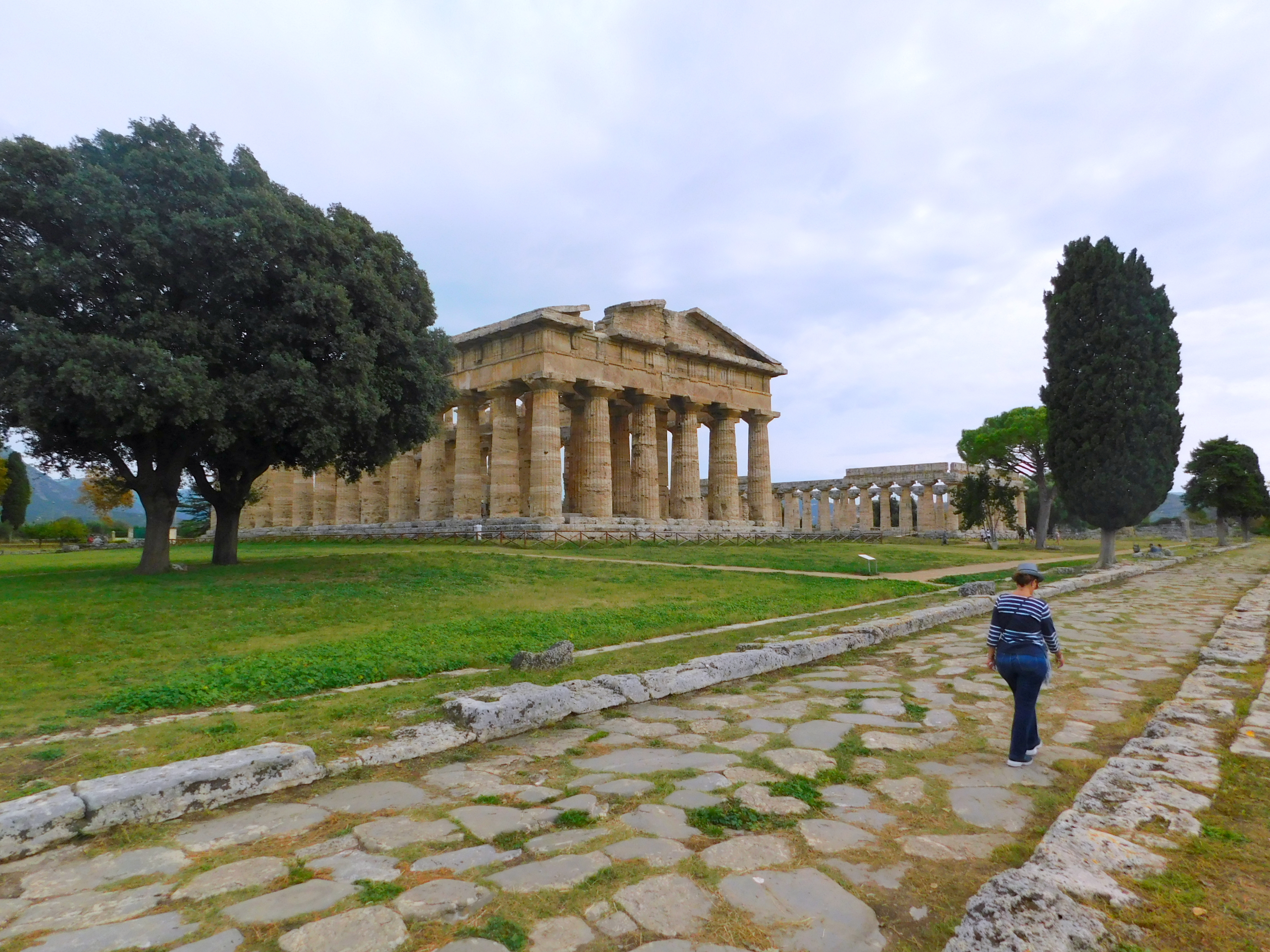
Paestum along Via Sacra

2. Roman Era: Salerno was known in Roman times as Salernum. It became an important Roman colony and was renowned for its productivity. The gulf served as a vital hub for trade and transportation, providing access to the sea. Amalfi appears to have been founded by a Roman family bound for Constantinople. When their ship ran aground on a nearby shore, they settled the area, naming it Melphes (today Melfi). A few years later, they moved further north and established a new town, which they called "A Melphes" in memory of the abandoned village of Melphes – hence today's town of Amalfi.

3. Medieval Period: In the Middle Ages, Salerno and the surrounding areas were part of the Lombard Duchy of Salerno. The city was a center of learning and culture, especially during the 5th-7th centuries, when Roman Catholic diocese of Salerno was established, and in the 9th and 10th centuries when the Schola Medica Salernitana, a famous medical school, was established, close the Giardino della Minerva. The Alfano I interest in medicine and the translation of Arabic treatises on the subject led him to invite Constantine the African from Carthage to Salerno to assist him. The town of Amalfi was the capital of the maritime republic known as the Duchy of Amalfi, an important trading power in the Mediterranean between 839 and around 1200.

4. Norman Conquest: In 1076 the Normans conquered Salerno and the surrounding region under Robert Guiscard, incorporating it into the Kingdom of Sicily. This marked a significant change in the area's political and cultural landscape. In 1084 Saint Matthew Cathedral was consecrated by Pope Gregory VII. The University was founded in 1150. In 1194 Salerno was sacked by forces of |Henry VI, Holy Roman Emperor and in 1260 Port of Salerno construction begins.

5. Renaissance and Beyond: Salerno and the Gulf continued to thrive in the Renaissance era. However, the region's importance gradually declined over the centuries as Naples, Palermo and other nearby cities became more prominent centers of trade, culture, and politics.

6. Modern History: In the modern era, the Gulf of Salerno has seen its share of artistical and historical events, including the Grand Tour of artist like Joseph Wright of Derby -with his "Grotto in the Gulf of Salerno" and the involvement in World War II when it served as a landing point for the Allied forces during the Italian Campaign.

== Climate ==
The climate of the Gulf of Salerno is purely Mediterranean, with mild winters with never abundant rainfall and hot summers which can also become muggy due to the high level of humidity.

Climate classification: zone C, 1087 GR/G On the Amalfi coast Based on the thirty-year reference average 1961–1990, the average temperature of the coldest month, January, stands at +10.7 °C; that of the hottest month, August, is +26.8 °C. In the Salerno area, based on the thirty-year reference average 1961–1990, the average temperature of the coldest month, January, stands at +10.4 °C; that of the hottest months, July and August, is +26.4 °C; a general overestimation of the values due to the urban heat island effect cannot be ruled out.[2] In the Sele plain the average temperature of the coldest month, January, stands at +12.6 °C; that of the hottest months, July and August, is +30.9 °C. The average annual rainfall is abundant, exceeding 1100 mm, with a minimum between late spring and summer and a regular and high distribution in the rest of the year. In Paestum the average temperature of the coldest month, January, stands at +6.8 °C; that of the hottest month, August, is +24.4 °C.

The presence of a sunny climate for at least 250 days a year makes this land a destination for tourists not only in the Summer, but also in the spring and autumn months.
