= Minerva's Garden (Salerno) =

Botanical garden in Italy

Coordinates: 40.6811°N 14.7537°E

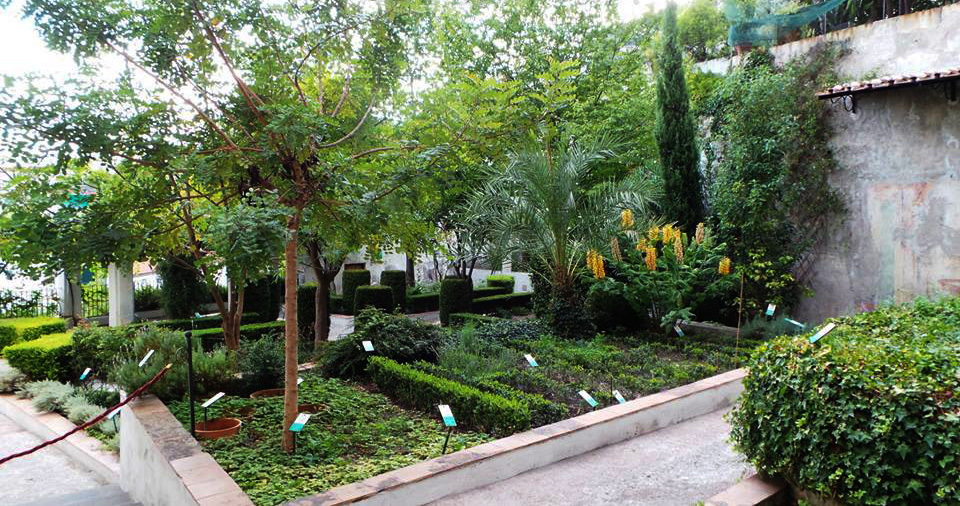
- Interactive map of Minerva's Garden
- Type: Botanic Garden
- Location: Salerno, Italy
- Status: Open all year

Minerva's Garden (Giardino della Minerva) is located in the heart of the old town of Salerno, in a zone known as the "Plaium montis" in the Middle Ages. It is halfway along an ideal route that runs along the axis of the walled and terraced vegetable gardens, climbing from the Municipal Park, near the river Fusandola, towards the Arechi Castle.

== History ==
The "viridarium" was owned by the Silvatico family from the 12th century, as recorded by a parchment conserved in the Badia archives in Cava de' Tirreni. Later on, in the first twenty years of the 14th century, Matteo Silvatico created a garden of simples here, a forerunner of all future botanical gardens in Europe.

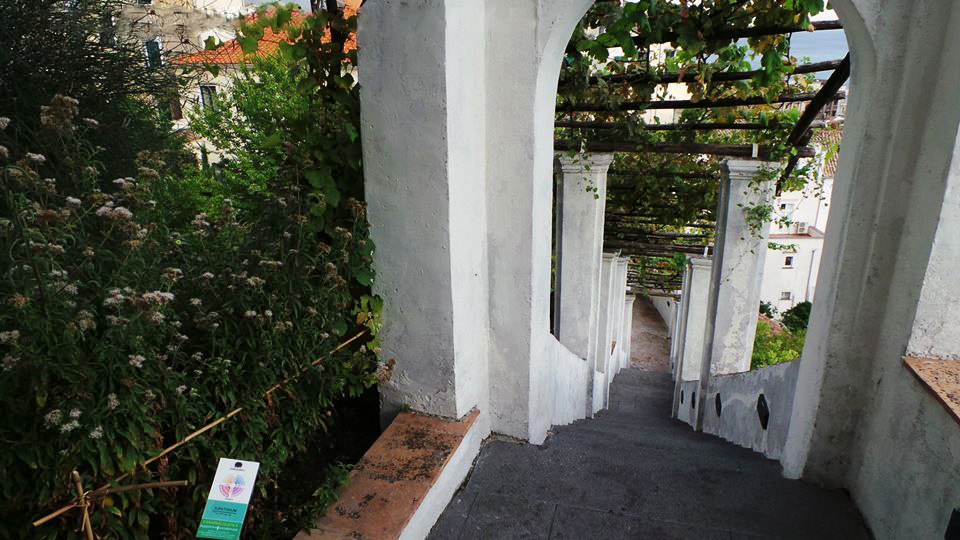
The garden

In this area of extraordinary cultural value, which can now be identified in the area of the Minerva's Garden, he cultivated some of the plants used to produce the active ingredients employed for therapeutic purposes. Matteo Silvatico also taught here, showing the plants to the scholars at the School of Medicine and providing their names and characteristics. During a recent archaeological dig, the mediaeval garden was found at a depth of around two metres under the current ground level.

The last owner was Giovanni Capasso who, thanks to the interest of the lawyer Gaetano Nunziante, chairman of the Asilo di Mendicità, donated the whole property to this charitable institution immediately after the Second World War. In November 1991 a project was presented for the creation of a botanical garden dedicated to Silvatico and his garden of simples. This project was funded and developed in 2000 by the Municipal Council, using funds from the European Urban programme. Now that the restoration work has been completed, visitors to the garden can see an interesting series of elements dating back to the 17th and 18th century. One of the most attractive is the long flight of steps, marked by cruciform pillars, which support a wooden pergola.

== Botanical species ==
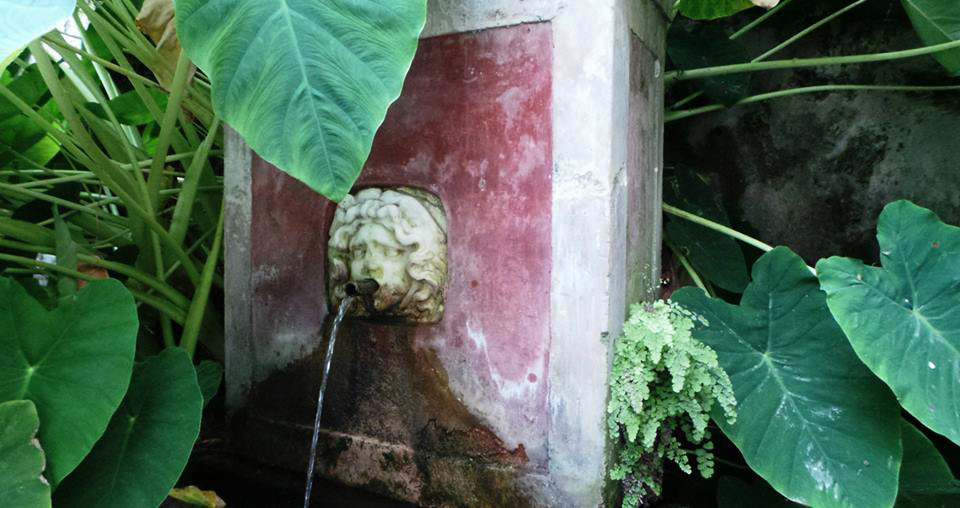
The fountain with the Colocasia

Minerva's Garden is not a traditional botanical garden, but follows specific themes in various zones. The most important educational element of the theme linked to Salerno's botanical tradition is the illustration, in the largest terrace in the garden, of the ancient plant classification system. In all the other flower beds in the garden, the plants are arranged on the basis of landscaping. All the species are identified with a label that refers to the ideal position of the simple in a design representing the positioning of the elements, superimposed over the concentric subdivision of the grades.

After the 2001 restoration, several rare species were planted, mostly chosen among those quoted in the Opus Pandectarum Medicinae, which were used as medicines in the Middle Age.

=== List of the species ===
A

- Acanthus mollis
- Achillea millefolium
- Aconitum napellus
- Acorus calamus
- Adiantum capillus-veneris
- Agrimonia eupatoria
- Ajuga reptans
- Alisma plantago-aquatica
- Aloe vera
- Allium schoenoprasum
- Allium ursinum
- Alpinia zerumbet
- Althaea officinalis
- Ammi visnaga
- Anchusa officinalis
- Anethum graveolens
- Anthemis cotula
- Anthriscus cerefolium
- Arbutus unedo
- Arctium lappa
- Aristolochia clematitis
- Armoracia rusticana
- Artemisia abrotanum
- Artemisia absinthium
- Artemisia dracunculus
- Arum italicum
- Asarum europaeum
- Asparagus acutifolius
- Asphodelus albus
- Asplenium ceterach
- Asplenium scolopendrium
- Athyrium filix-femina
- Atropa belladonna

B

- Berberis vulgaris
- Borago officinalis
- Calamintha nepeta

C

- Calendula officinalis
- Campanula medium
- Capparis spinosa
- Carthamus tinctorius
- Carum carvi
- Cassia fistula
- Centranthus ruber
- Ceratonia siliqua
- Chamaemelum nobile
- Chelidonium majus
- Cinnamomum camphora
- Cistus creticus
- Cistus ladanifer
- Cistus monspeliensis
- Citrus limon
- Citrus medica
- Citrus reticulata
- Citrus sinensis
- Colocasia esculenta
- Conium maculatum
- Coriandrum sativum
- Cornus mas
- Crataegus azarolus
- Crithmum maritimum
- Crocus sativus
- Cucumis sativus
- Cupressus sempervirens
- Cyclamen hederifolium
- Cydonia oblonga
- Cyperus papyrus
- Cytinus hypocistis

D

- Dactylorhiza maculata
- Diplotaxis tenuifolia
- Dipsacus fullonum
- Doronicum pardalianches
- Dracaena draco

E

- Elettaria cardamomum
- Euphorbia cyparissias

F

- Ficus carica
- Filipendula ulmaria
- Filipendula vulgaris
- Foeniculum vulgare
- Fragaria vesca
- Fraxinus ornus

G

- Galega officinalis
- Galium verum
- Gladiolus italicus
- Glaucium flavum
- Glycyrrhiza glabra
- Gossypium herbaceum

H

- Hedera helix
- Helichrysum italicum
- Helichrysum stoechas
- Helleborus viridis
- Hippophae rhamnoides
- Hyoscyamus albus
- Hyoscyamus niger
- Hypericum perforatum
- Hyssopus officinalis

I

- Inula helenium
- Iris florentina
- Isatis tinctoria

J

- Jasminum officinale
- Jasminum sambac
- Juniperus communis

K

- Kickxia elatine

L

- Lablab purpureus
- Laurus nobilis
- Lavandula angustifolia
- Lavandula dentata
- Levisticum officinale
- Lilium martagon
- Linum usitatissimum
- Lithospermum officinale
- Lonicera caprifolium
- Lycopus europaeus
- Lysimachia vulgaris
- Lythrum salicaria

M

- Malva sylvestris
- Mandragora autumnalis
- Matricaria recutita
- Melilotus officinalis
- Melissa officinalis
- Mentha aquatica
- Mentha longifolia
- Mentha suaveolens
- Meum athamanticum
- Myriophyllum aquaticum
- Miriofillo
- Myrtus communis
- Myrtus communis

N

- Narcissus tazetta
- Nasturtium microphyllum
- Nepeta cataria
- Nerium oleander
- Nigella damascena
- Nuphar lutea
- Nymphaea alba

O

- Ocimum tenuiflorum
- Olea europaea
- Ononis spinosa
- Origanum majorana
- Origanum vulgare
- Osmunda regalis

P

- Paeonia officinalis
- Pastinaca sativa
- Petroselinum crispum
- Petroselinum sativum
- Phoenix dactylifera
- Physalis alkekengi
- Pimpinella anisum
- Piper nigrum
- Pistacia lentiscus
- Pistacia vera
- Plantago major
- Polygonatum odoratum
- Polypodium vulgare
- Portulaca oleracea
- Potentilla erecta
- Prunus armeniaca
- Prunus avium
- Prunus cerasus
- Prunus domestica
- Psyllium afrum
- Punica granatum
- Pyrus communis

R

- Rhamnus catharticus
- Rheum rhabarbarum
- Ricinus communis
- Rosa gallica
- Rosa canina
- Rosa sempervirens
- Rosmarinus officinalis
- Rubia tinctorum
- Rubus idaeus
- Rubus ulmifolius
- Rumex acetosa
- Ruscus aculeatus
- Ruscus hypoglossum
- Ruta graveolens

S

- Saccharum officinarum
- Salix alba
- Salvia officinalis
- Sambucus nigra
- Santolina chamaecyparissus
- Saponaria officinalis
- Satureja hortensis
- Satureja montana
- Scrophularia nodosa
- Sempervivum tectorum
- Sesamum indicum
- Silene coronaria
- Silybum marianum
- Sinapis alba
- Smilax aspera
- Sorbus domestica
- Spartium junceum
- Stachys officinalis
- Symphytum officinale

T

- Tanacetum balsamita
- Tanacetum parthenium
- Tanacetum vulgare
- Taraxacum officinale
- Taxus baccata
- Teucrium chamaedrys
- Thalictrum flavum
- Thymus vulgaris
- Thymus serpyllum
- Trigonella foenum-graecum

U

- Umbilicus rupestris
- Urginea maritima

V

- Valeriana officinalis
- Verbascum thapsus
- Verbena officinalis
- Viola odorata
- Vitex agnus-castus
- Vitis vinifera

W

- Withania somnifera

Z

- Ziziphus jujuba

== See also ==
- Salerno
- List of botanical gardens in Italy
