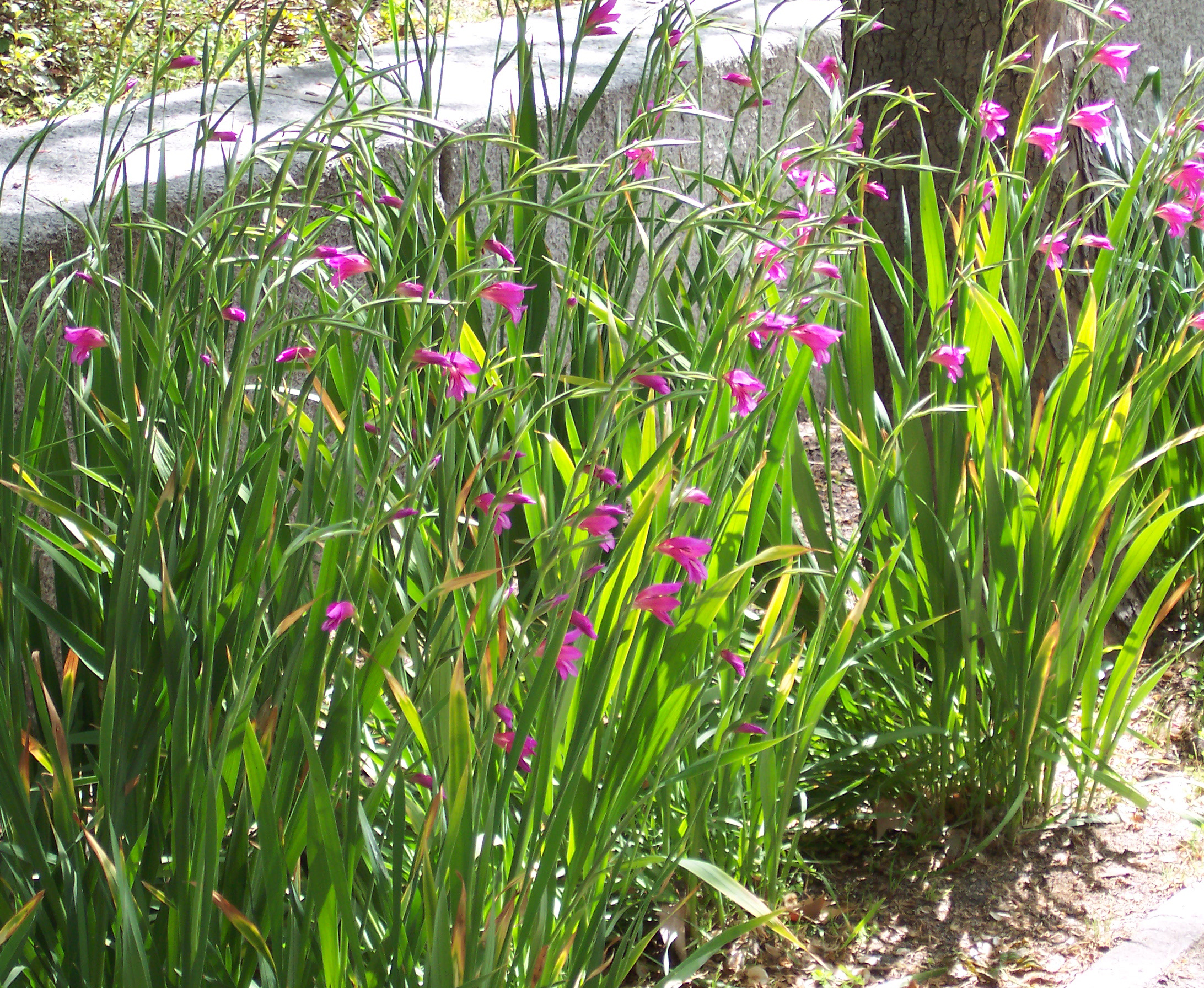
- Gladiolus communis, Real Jardín Botánico de Madrid

Scientific classification
- Kingdom: Plantae
- Clade: Tracheophytes
- Clade: Angiosperms
- Clade: Monocots
- Order: Asparagales
- Family: Iridaceae
- Genus: Gladiolus
- Species: G. communis

Binomial name
- Gladiolus communis L.

= Gladiolus communis =

Species of flowering plant

Gladiolus communis, the eastern gladiolus, or common corn-flag, is a species of flowering plant in the family Iridaceae, native to temperate northern Africa, western Asia and southern Europe, from the Mediterranean to the Caucasus, and widely naturalised in frost-free locations elsewhere – such as coastal parts of the southwestern British Isles.

It is a vigorous cormous herbaceous perennial growing to 1 m (3 ft 3 in) tall with linear leaves and bright pink flowers in spring. Two subspecies are identified:

- G. communis subsp. communis
- G. communis subsp. byzantinus (Mill.) A. P. Ham.

In cultivation the latter has gained the Royal Horticultural Society's Award of Garden Merit.

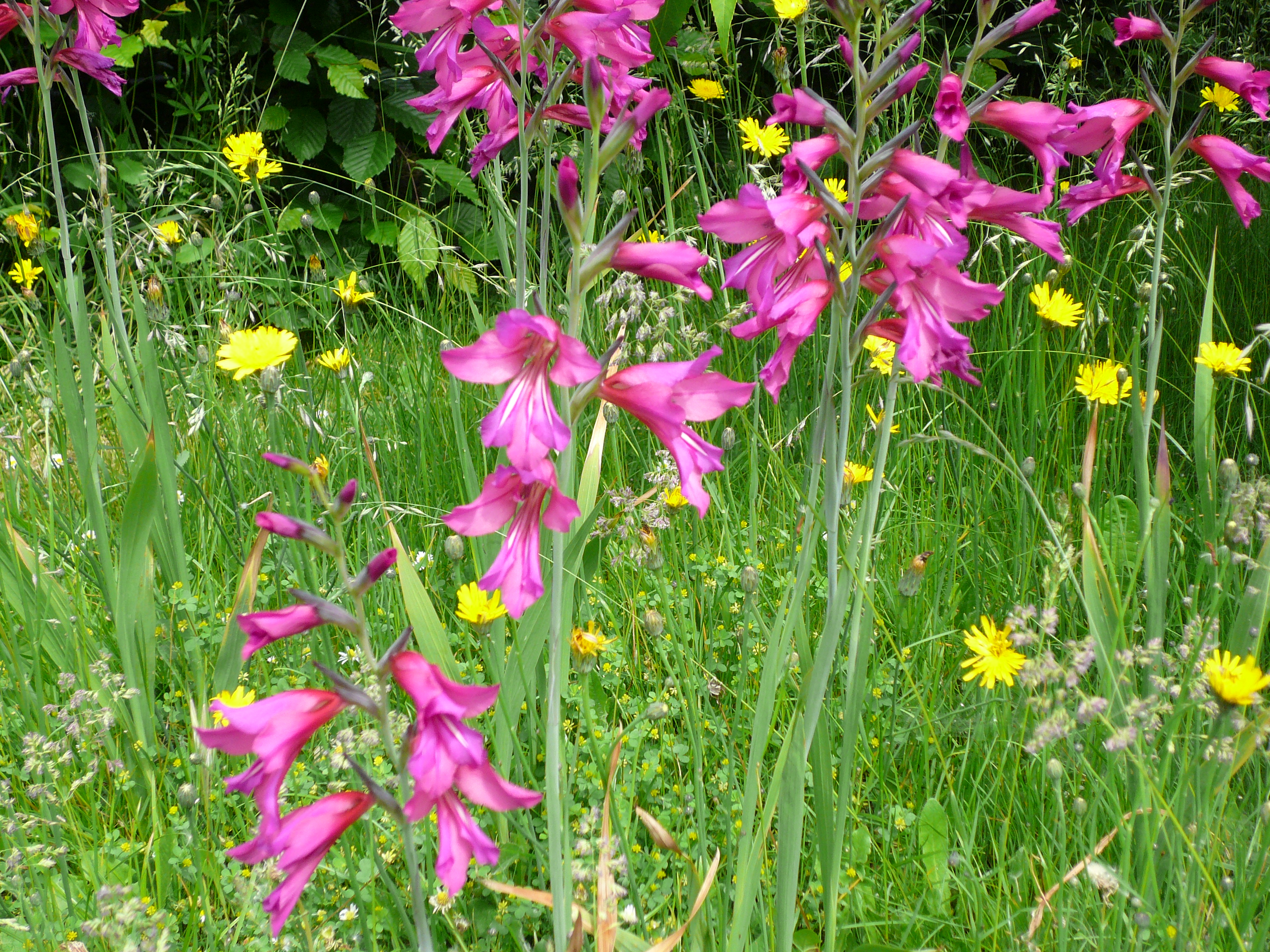
G. communis subsp. byzantinus
