= Byzantinus =

Byzantinus may refer to:

- Gladiolus × byzantinus, flower
- Aristophanes Byzantinus, ancient Greek grammarian
- Dionysius Byzantinus, ancient Greek geographer
- Stephanus Byzantinus, Byzantine grammarian
