= Nasturtium africanum =

Conservation status
- Endangered (IUCN 3.1)

Scientific classification
- Kingdom: Plantae
- Clade: Tracheophytes
- Clade: Angiosperms
- Clade: Eudicots
- Clade: Rosids
- Order: Brassicales
- Family: Brassicaceae
- Genus: Nasturtium
- Species: N. africanum

Binomial name
- Nasturtium africanum Braun-Blanq.

Synonyms
- Rorippa africana (Braun-Blanq.) Maire

Species of aquatic plant

Nasturtium africanum, the Moroccan watercress, is an aquatic plant endemic to Morocco. Two subspecies are recognized:

- Nasturtium africanum subsp. africanum - northwestern Morocco
- Nasturtium africanum subsp. mesatlanticum (Litard. & Maire) Greuter & Burdet (syn = Rorippa africana subsp. mesatlantica Litard. & Maire = Nasturtium mesatlanticum O.E. Schulz) -- Mid-Atlas Mountains of Morocco

Both subspecies are considered endangered.
