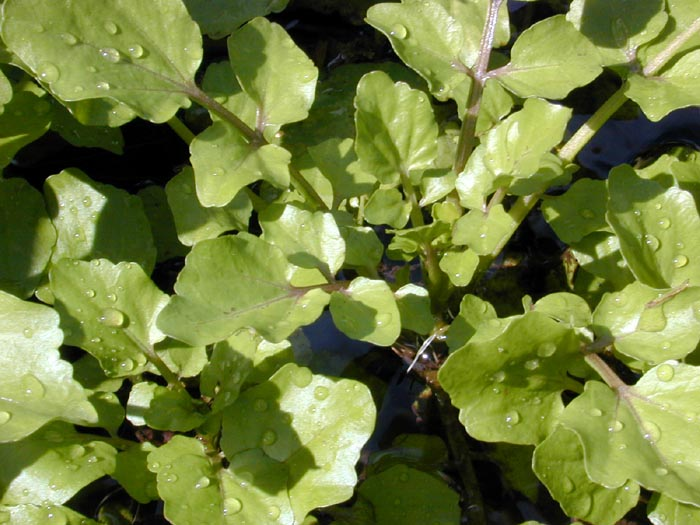
- Nasturtium microphyllum, a watercress, in Hawai'i

Scientific classification
- Kingdom: Plantae
- Clade: Tracheophytes
- Clade: Angiosperms
- Clade: Eudicots
- Clade: Rosids
- Order: Brassicales
- Family: Brassicaceae
- Genus: Nasturtium; W.T.Aiton

Species
- See text

Synonyms
- Baeumerta G.Gaertn., B.Mey. & Scherb.; Cardaminum Moench; Dictyosperma Regel; Pirea T.Durand

= Nasturtium (plant genus) =

Genus of flowering plants

Nasturtium (/nəˈstɜːrʃəm/) is a genus of a small number of plant species in the family Brassicaceae (cabbage family) commonly known as watercress or yellowcress. The best known species are the edible Nasturtium officinale and Nasturtium microphyllum. Nasturtium was previously synonymised with Rorippa, but molecular evidence supports its maintenance as a distinct genus more closely related to Cardamine than to Rorippa sensu stricto.

These plants are related to garden cress and mustard, noteworthy for a peppery, tangy (pungent) flavor. The name Nasturtium comes from the Latin nasus tortus, meaning "twisted nose", in reference to the effect on the nasal passages of eating the plants. Nasturtium foliage is used as food by the caterpillars of certain Lepidoptera, including Orthonama obstipata (The Gem).

One species, Nasturtium gambellii, is federally listed in California as an endangered species.

== Nomenclature ==
The genus Nasturtium should not be confused with the ornamental garden plant, usually grown as an annual, that is commonly known as nasturtium (Tropaeolum majus). Though not closely related, the leaves of the garden nasturtium also have a peppery taste.

== Species ==
As of September 2025, Plants of the World Online accepts the following species and hybrids:

- Nasturtium floridanum (Al-Shehbaz & Rollins) Al-Shehbaz & R.A.Price – Florida watercress or Florida yellowcress
- Nasturtium gambellii (S.Watson) O.E.Schulz (orth. var. N. gambelii) – Gambel's watercress or Gambel's yellowcress
- Nasturtium microphyllum (Boenn.) Rchb. – onerow watercress or onerow yellowcress
- Nasturtium officinale W.T.Aiton – watercress or yellowcress
- Nasturtium × sterile (Airy Shaw) Oefelein – N. officinale × N. microphyllum, hybrid watercress

Plants of the World Online regards Nasturtium africanum as a synonym of Rorippa africana.
