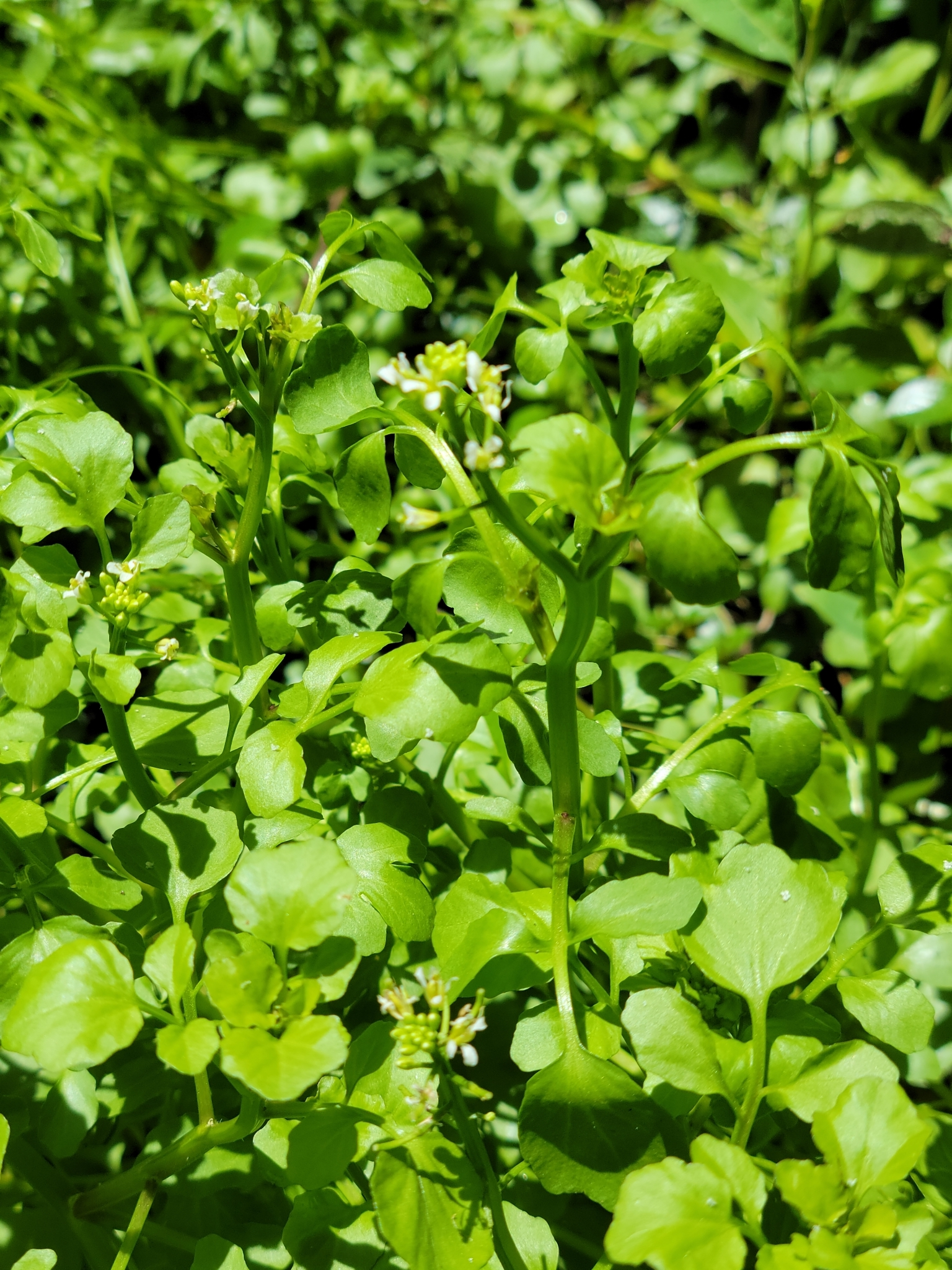

Scientific classification
- Kingdom: Plantae
- Clade: Tracheophytes
- Clade: Angiosperms
- Clade: Eudicots
- Clade: Rosids
- Order: Brassicales
- Family: Brassicaceae
- Genus: Nasturtium
- Species: N. floridanum

Binomial name
- Nasturtium floridanum (Al-Shehbaz & Rollins) Al-Shehbaz & R.A. Price

Synonyms
- Cardamine curvisiliqua Shuttlew. ex Chapm.; Nasturtium stylosum Shuttlew. ex O.E. Schulz; Rorippa floridana Al-Shehbaz & Rollins

= Nasturtium floridanum =

Florida watercress

Species of aquatic plant

Nasturtium floridanum, common names Florida yellowcress and Florida watercress, is an aquatic plant species endemic to Florida, though widely distributed within that state. It is found in wet places at elevations less than 50 m.

Nasturtium floridanum can be distinguished from the more common N. officinale by its much smaller seeds, less than 2 mm across.
