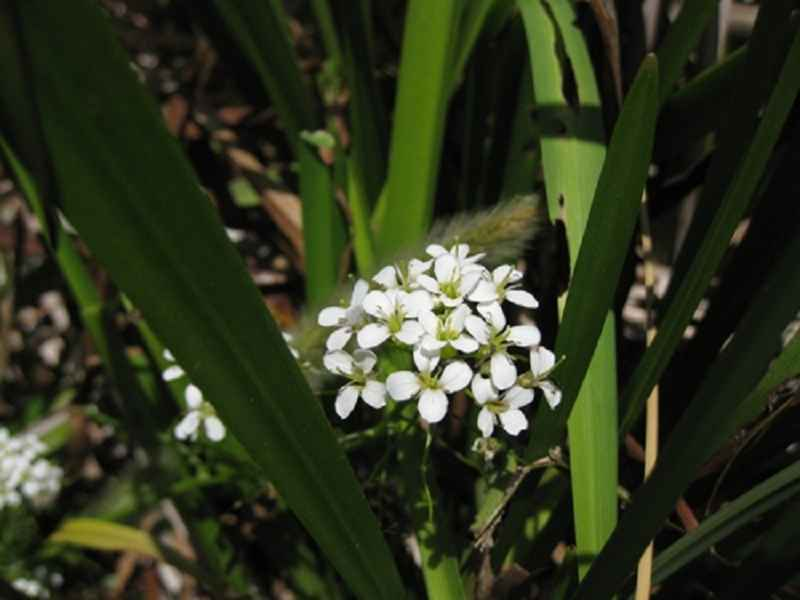

Conservation status
- Endangered (ESA)

Scientific classification
- Kingdom: Plantae
- Clade: Tracheophytes
- Clade: Angiosperms
- Clade: Eudicots
- Clade: Rosids
- Order: Brassicales
- Family: Brassicaceae
- Genus: Nasturtium
- Species: N. gambellii

Binomial name
- Nasturtium gambellii (S.Watson) O.E.Schulz

Synonyms
- Cardamine gambellii S.Watson; Rorippa gambellii (S.Watson) Rollins & Al-Shehbaz

= Nasturtium gambellii =

Gambel's watercress

Species of flowering plant

Nasturtium gambellii (syn. Rorippa gambellii) is a rare species of flowering plant in the mustard family known by the common names Gambel's yellowcress and Gambel's watercress. It is known from three or four scattered occurrences in California. It is also native to central Mexico and Guatemala. Its total U.S. population was last estimated at fewer than 300 individuals. It was federally listed in California, as an endangered species of the United States in 1993.

Some sources spell the epithet with a single "l" as "gambelii," others with a double "ll" as "gambellii." Watson, in the original 1876 publication, spelled it with a double "l" and stated that it was named after "Gambell," collector of the type specimen. The collector was in fact William Gambel. Section 60.7 of the ICN states that such errors in the spelling of personal names is to be corrected only in the case of the omission of the final letter of the person's name. This is not what happened here. Watson added an extra letter rather than deleting a letter. Hence Watson's error must stand uncorrected in the scientific epithet, though no such rules apply to the common name.

Nasturtium gambellii is a perennial herb growing decumbent to erect, its branching stems reaching up to 2 meters long. It is aquatic or semi-aquatic, its herbage sometimes floating on standing water or sprawling over wet ground. The leaves are up to 10 centimeters long and each is divided into several pairs of toothed, pointed leaflets. The inflorescence is a raceme of flowers with spoon-shaped white petals each just under a centimeter long. The fruit is a long, narrow, cylindrical silique which may be 3 centimeters long but less than 2 millimeters wide. It contains up to 20 minute seeds, the fruit narrowing between each. The plant reproduces via seed or vegetatively by sprouting from spreading shoots.

This rare plant grows in fresh and brackish water habitat, such as lakesides and marshes. Two of its remaining California occurrences are at Oso Flaco Lake at the Guadalupe-Nipomo Dunes and on coastal land on Vandenberg Air Force Base.
