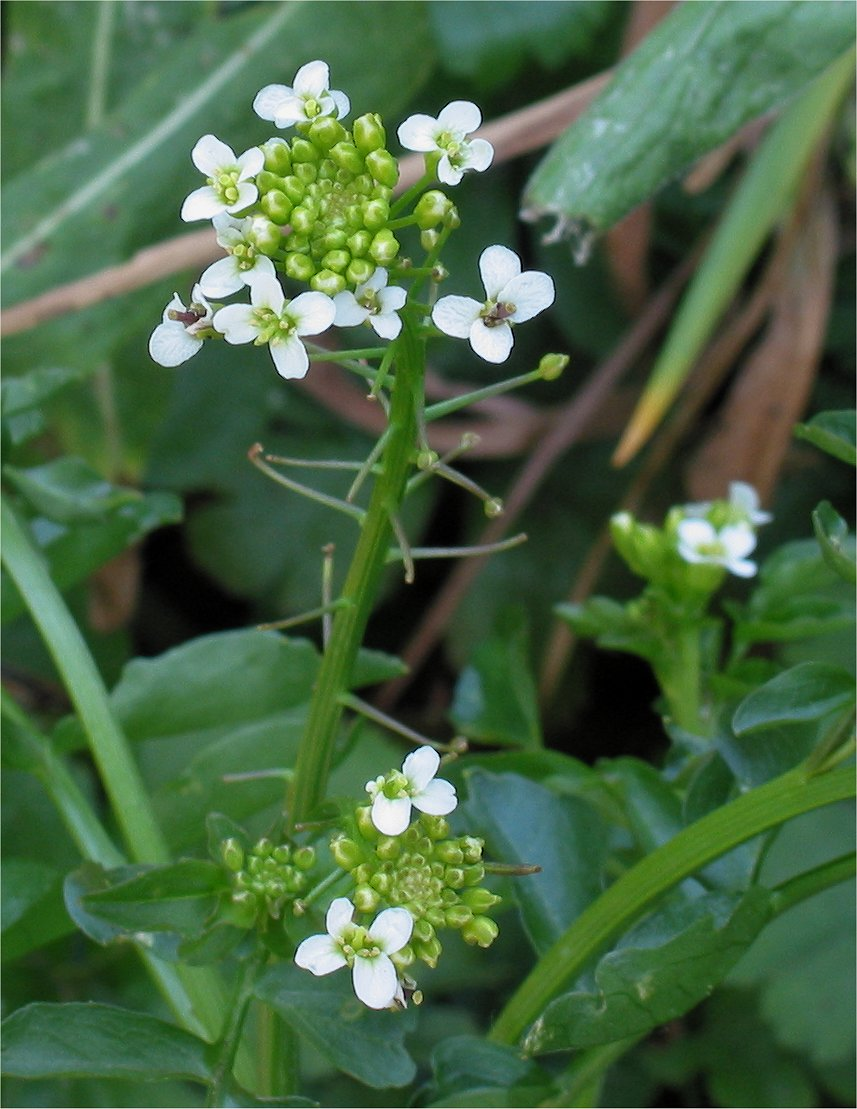

Scientific classification
- Kingdom: Plantae
- Clade: Embryophytes
- Clade: Tracheophytes
- Clade: Angiosperms
- Clade: Eudicots
- Clade: Rosids
- Order: Brassicales
- Family: Brassicaceae
- Genus: Nasturtium
- Species: N. microphyllum

Binomial name
- Nasturtium microphyllum Boenn. ex Rchb

Synonyms
- Nasturtium officinale var. microphyllum Boenn. ex Rchb.; Nasturtium officinale var. microphyllum Boenn.; Nasturtium officinale var. olgae N. Busch; Nasturtium uniseriatum H.W.Howard & Manton; Pirea olgae T. Durand ex Prantl; Rorippa microphylla (Boenn. ex Rchb.) Hyl. ex Á. Löve & D. Löve; Rorippa nasturtium-aquaticum subsp. microphylla (Boenn. ex Rchb.) O.Bolòs & Vigo

= Nasturtium microphyllum =

Species of aquatic plant

Nasturtium microphyllum, the onerow yellowcress, is an aquatic plant species widespread across Europe and Asia, and naturalized in the United States, Canada, Mexico, Central America, Australia, New Zealand and other places. It occurs in wet locations generally at elevations less than 1500 m. It has been reported from every Canadian province except Nova Scotia and Saskatchewan. In the US, it is fairly common in New England, New York, and Michigan, with scattered populations in the southern and western parts of the country.
