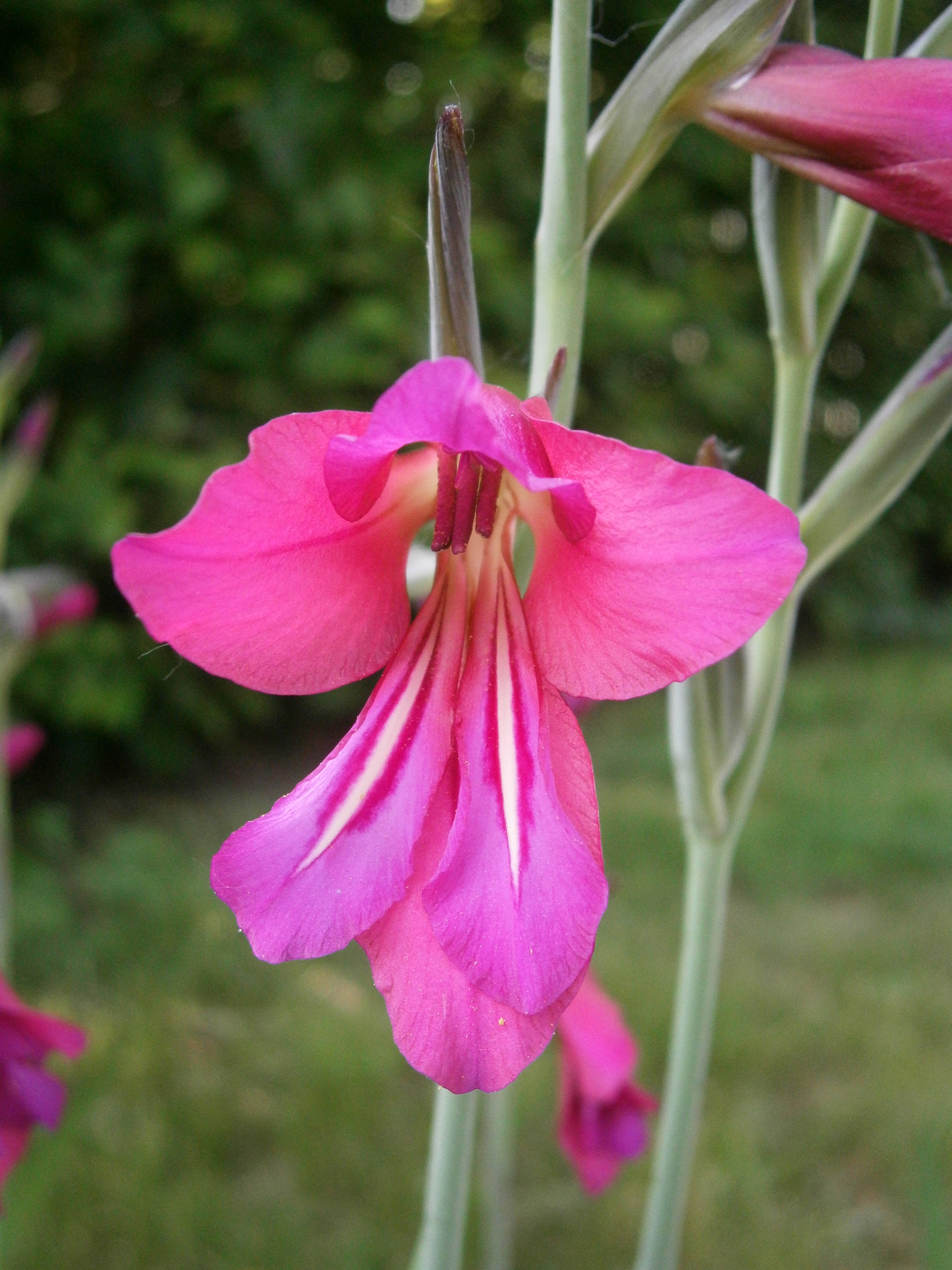
- Close-up of flower
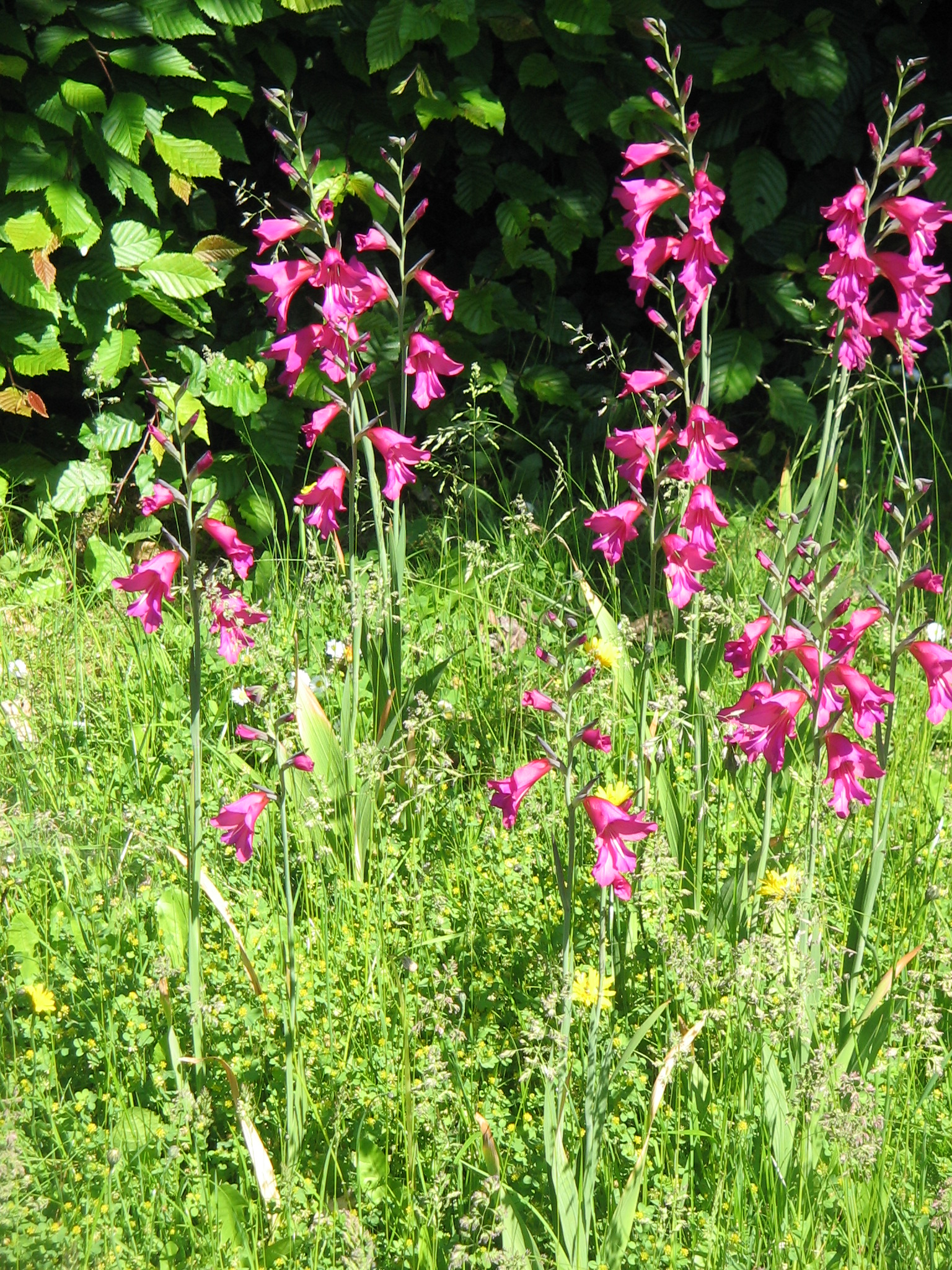
- A clump

Scientific classification
- Kingdom: Plantae
- Clade: Tracheophytes
- Clade: Angiosperms
- Clade: Monocots
- Order: Asparagales
- Family: Iridaceae
- Genus: Gladiolus
- Species: G. × byzantinus

Binomial name
- Gladiolus × byzantinus Mill.

Synonyms
- List: Gladiolus communis subsp. byzantinus (Mill.) Douin; Gladiolus communis var. byzantinus (Mill.) Martyn; Gladiolus × bornetii Ardoino; Gladiolus × gawleri Jord.; Gladiolus × littoralis Jord.; Gladiolus × porrigens Jord.; Gladiolus segetum subsp. bornetii (Ardoino) Bonnier & Layens; Gladiolus segetum proles bornetii (Ardoino) Rouy; Gladiolus segetum var. bornetii (Ardoino) P.Fourn.

= Gladiolus × byzantinus =

Species of plant

Gladiolus × byzantinus (syn. Gladiolus communis subsp. byzantinus), the eastern gladiolus, Byzantine gladiolus, or Byzantine sword-lily, is a naturally occurring hybrid species of flowering plant in the family Iridaceae. Its parents are Gladiolus dubius and Gladiolus italicus. In spite of its scientific and common names, it is native to the western Mediterranean region, and it has been introduced to the British Isles, and to Tasmania. A perennial arising from a corm and reaching 90 cm (35 in), it has gained the Royal Horticultural Society's Award of Garden Merit under its synonym Gladiolus communis subsp. byzantinus.

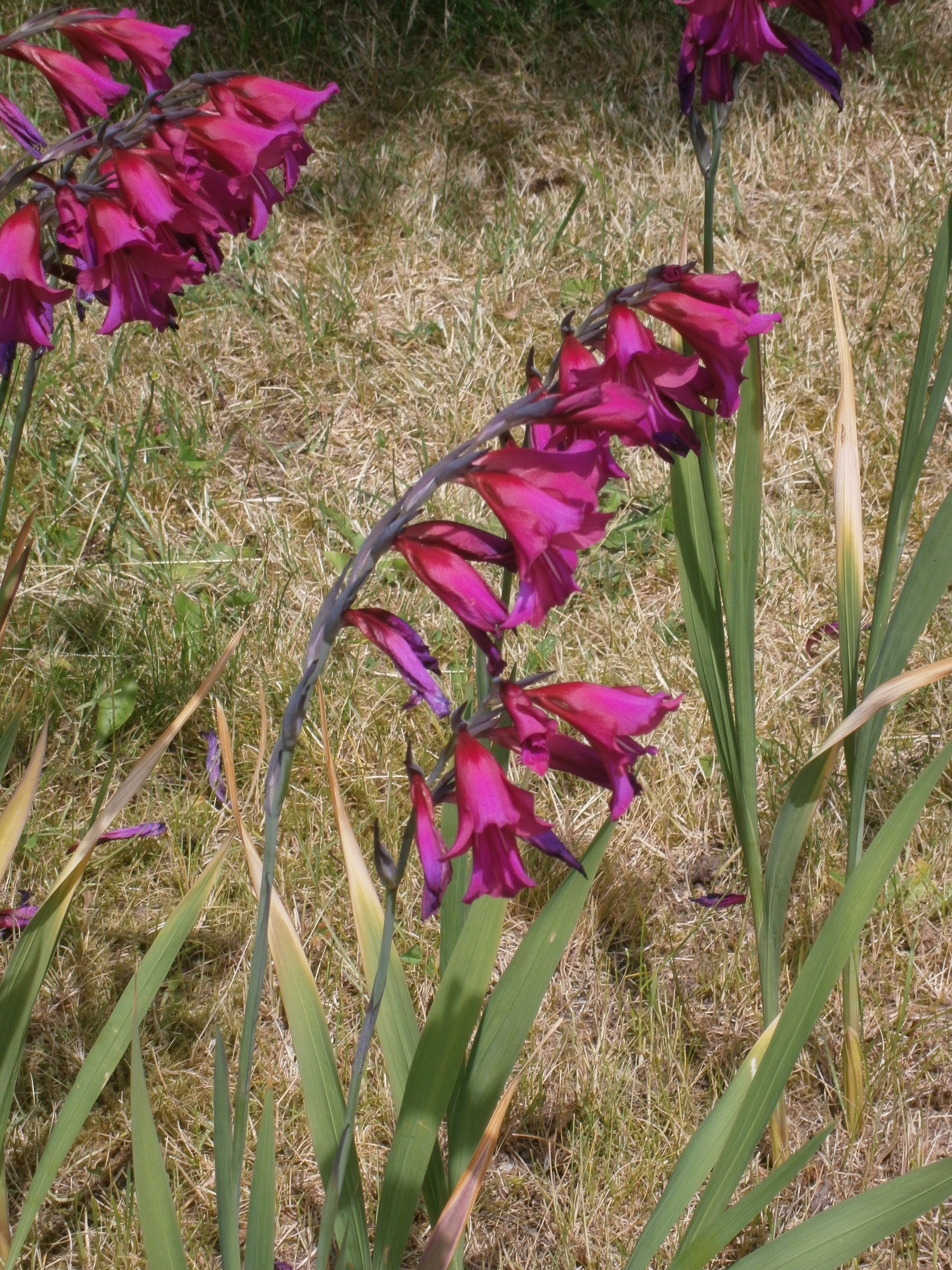
Side view, with spikes and leaves

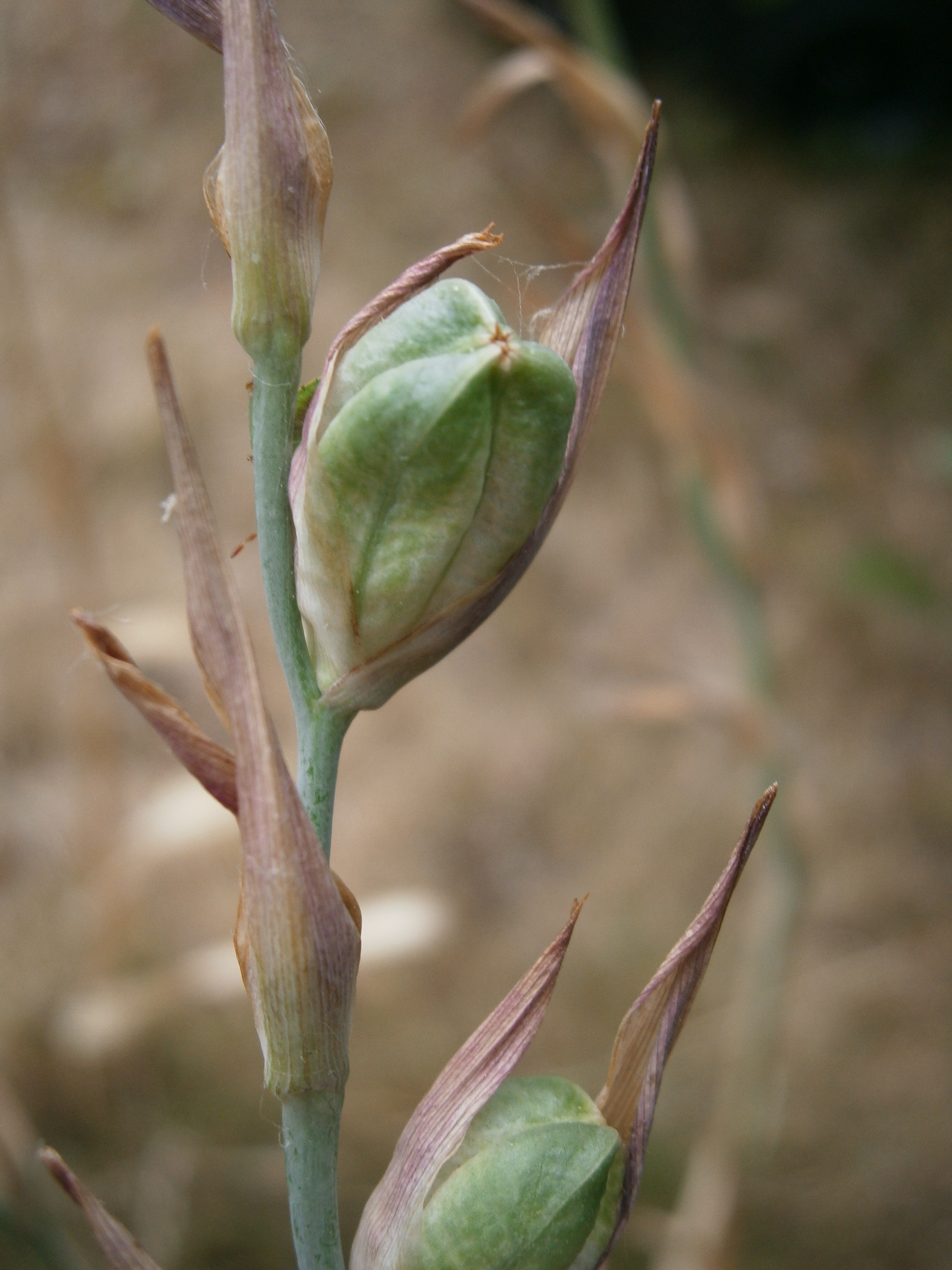
Fruit

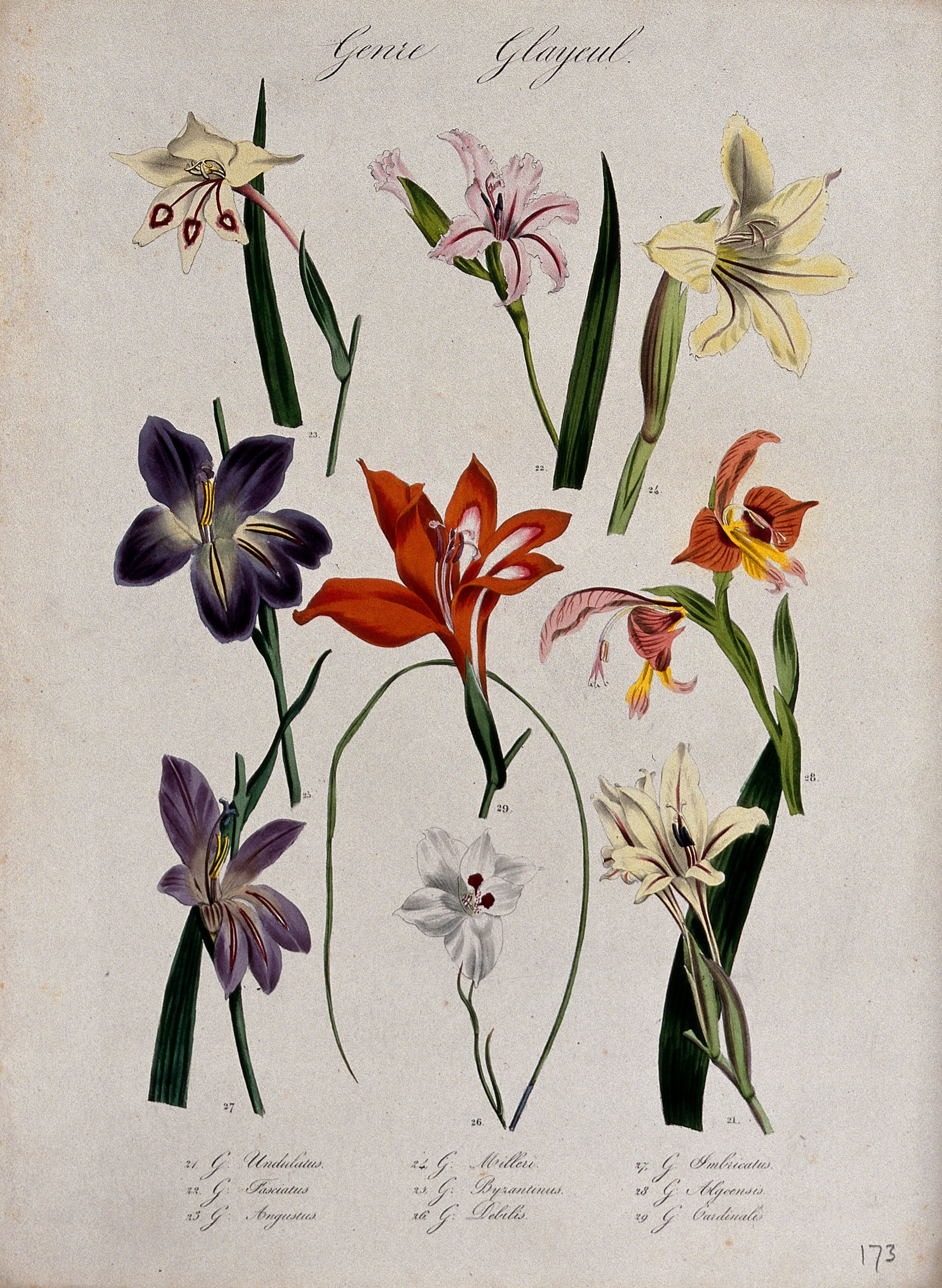
Botanical illustration; center
