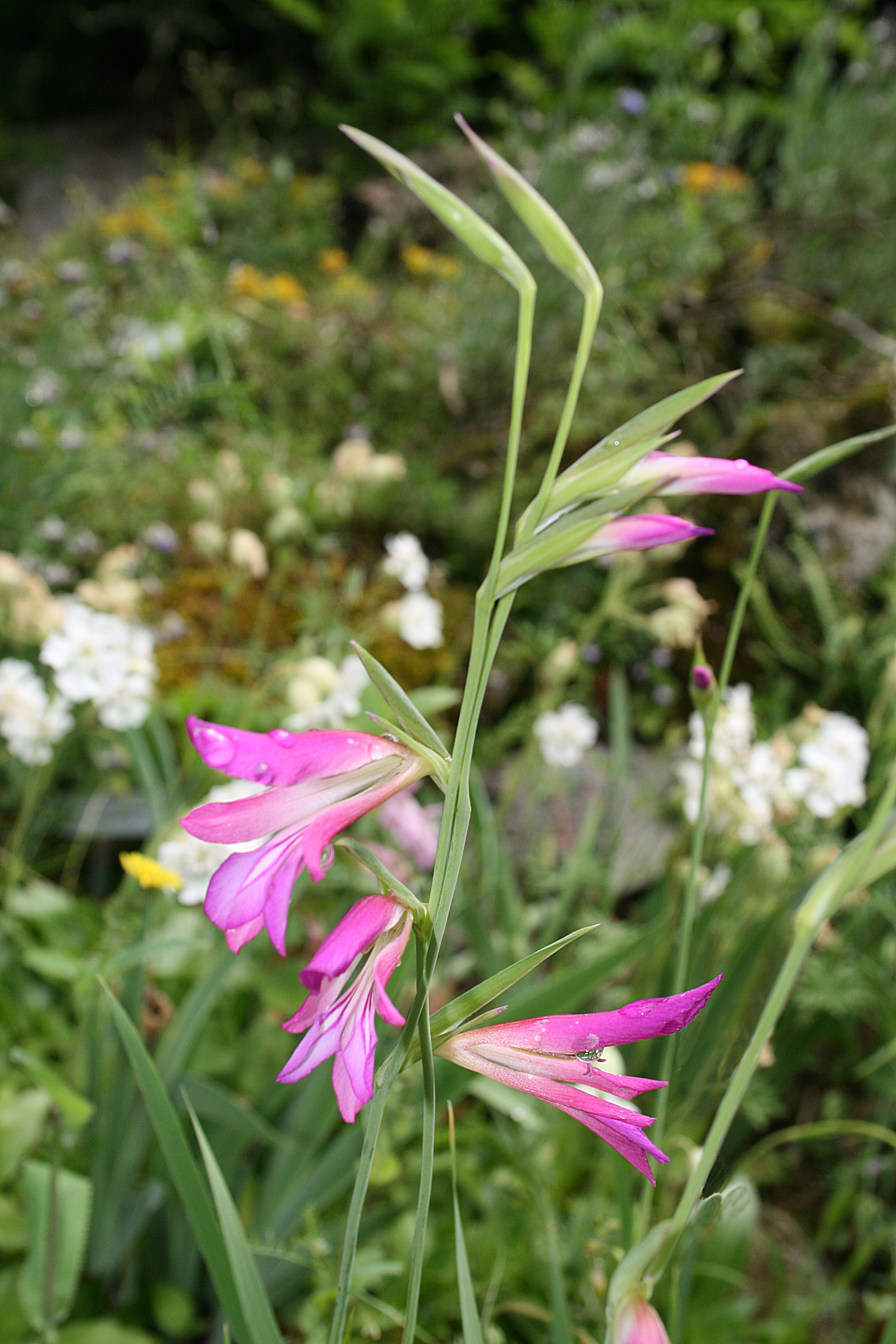

Scientific classification
- Kingdom: Plantae
- Clade: Tracheophytes
- Clade: Angiosperms
- Clade: Monocots
- Order: Asparagales
- Family: Iridaceae
- Genus: Gladiolus
- Species: G. italicus

Binomial name
- Gladiolus italicus Mill.

Synonyms
- Gladiolus segetum

= Gladiolus italicus =

Species of flowering plant

Gladiolus italicus is a species of gladiolus known by the common names Italian gladiolus, field gladiolus, and common sword-lily. Native to much of Eurasia and North Africa, it is well known on other continents where it is a common weed, particularly of cultivated fields and waste places. This perennial flower grows an erect stem approaching a meter in maximum height with a few long leaves around its base. Toward the top half of the generally unbranching stem is a spike inflorescence on which flowers appear at intervals. Each plant has up to 15 or 16 flowers. The flower is bright pink to magenta and several centimeters long with its stamens and style protruding from the throat. The fruit is a capsule about a centimeter long containing many seeds.

== Gallery ==
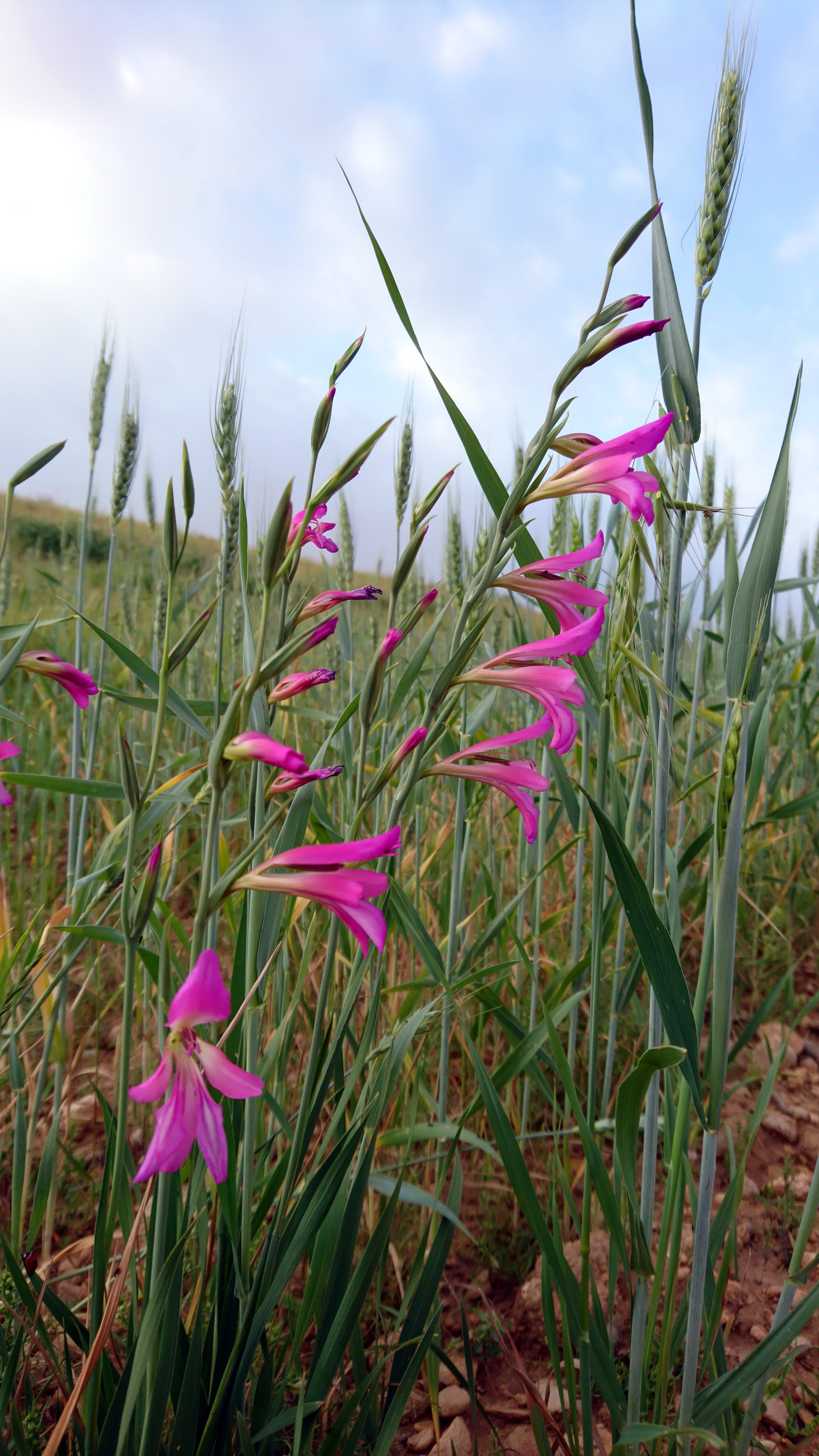
Growing wild in Behbahan

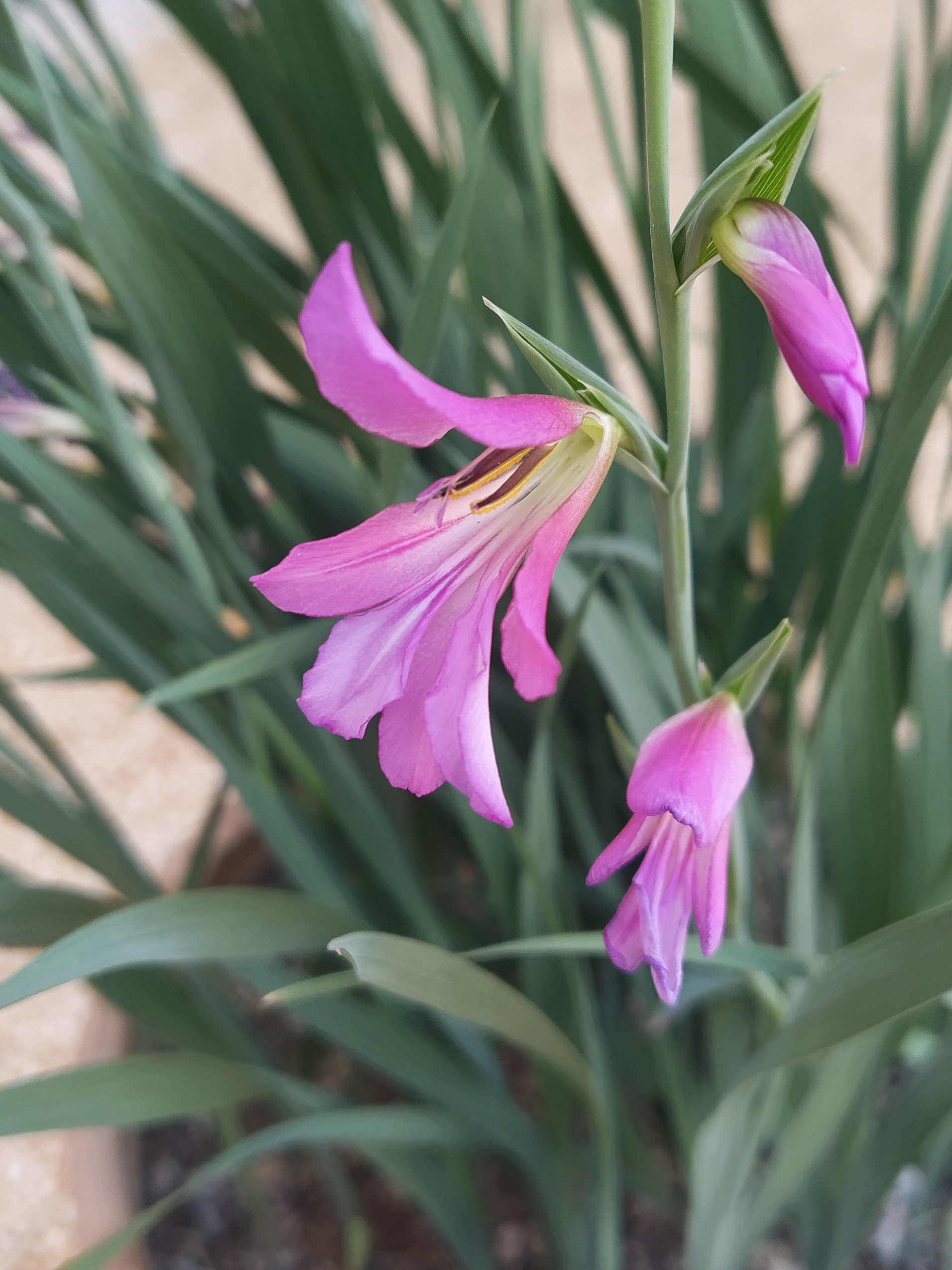
Growing wild in Behbahan

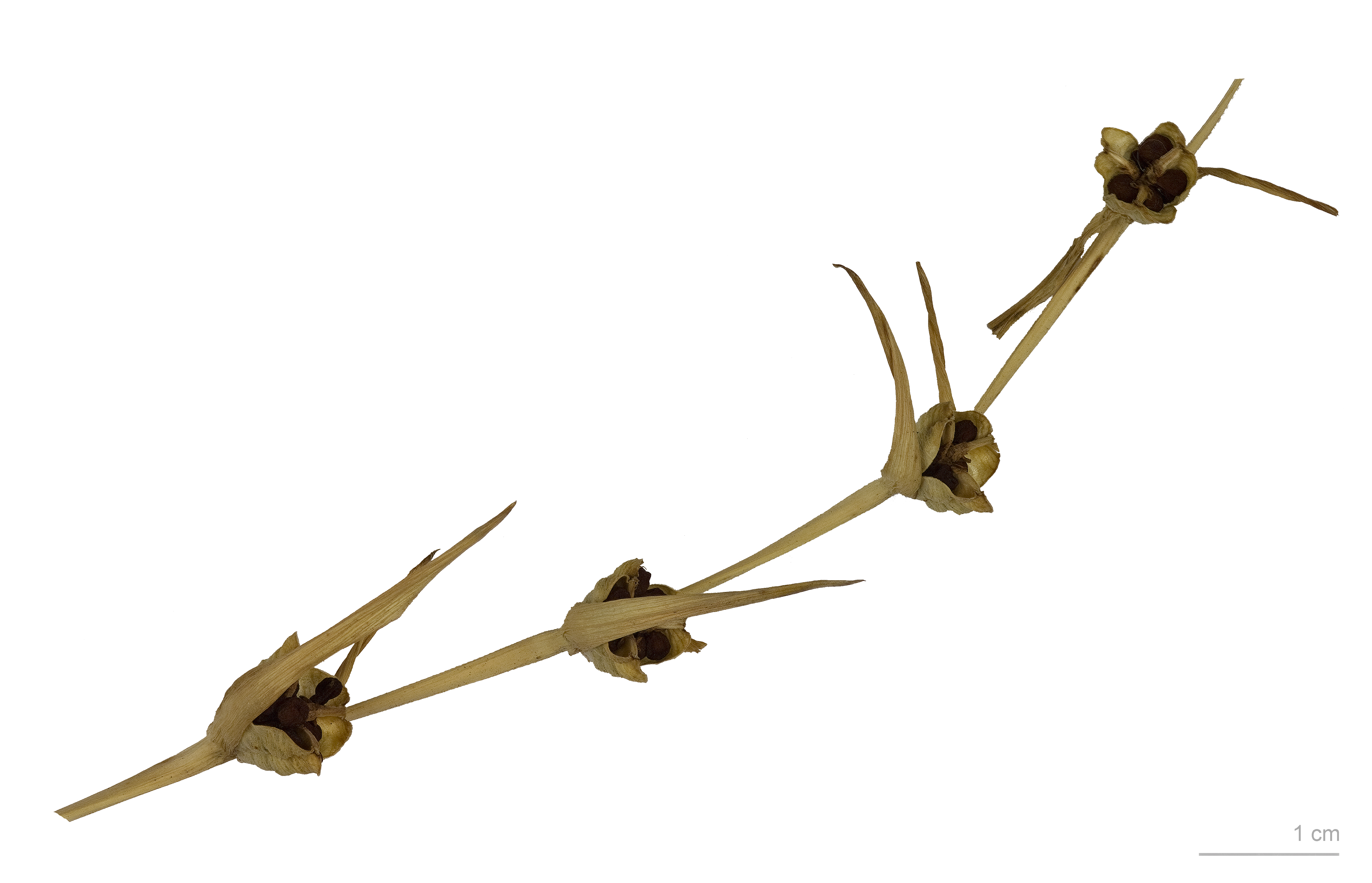
Fruits and seeds

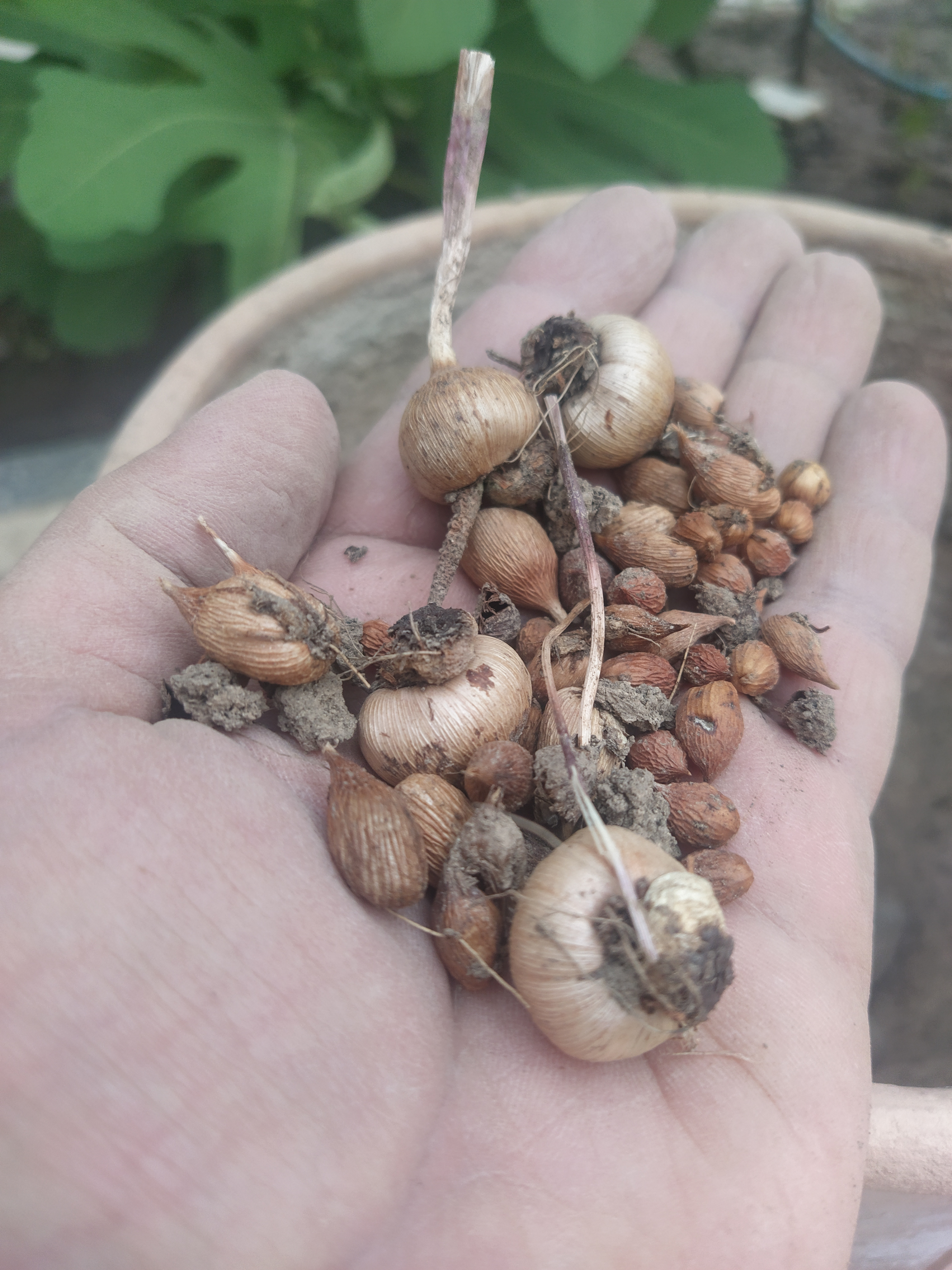
Gladiolus italicus corms of different ages and sizes

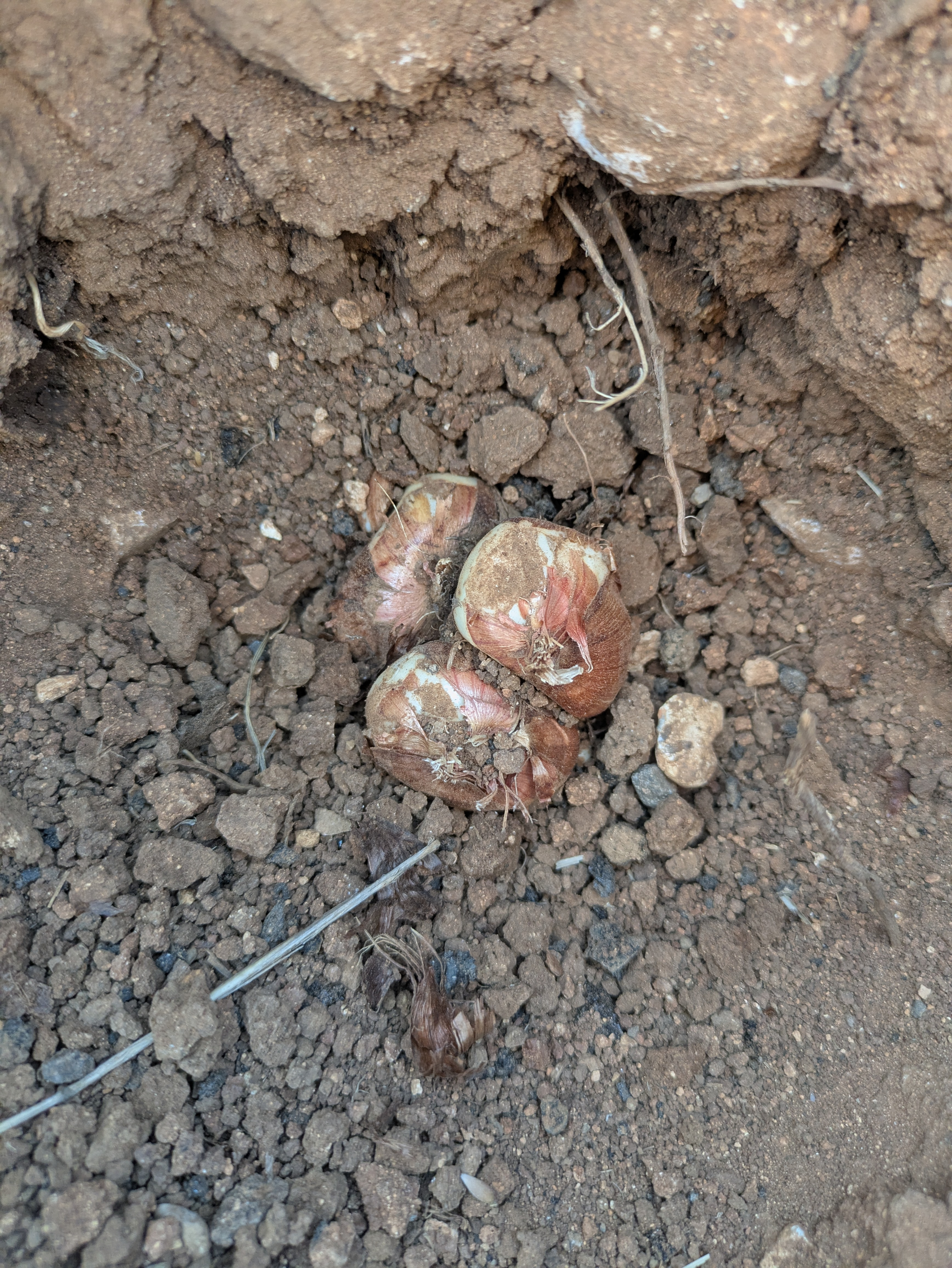
Gladiolus Italicus Corms, Behbahan

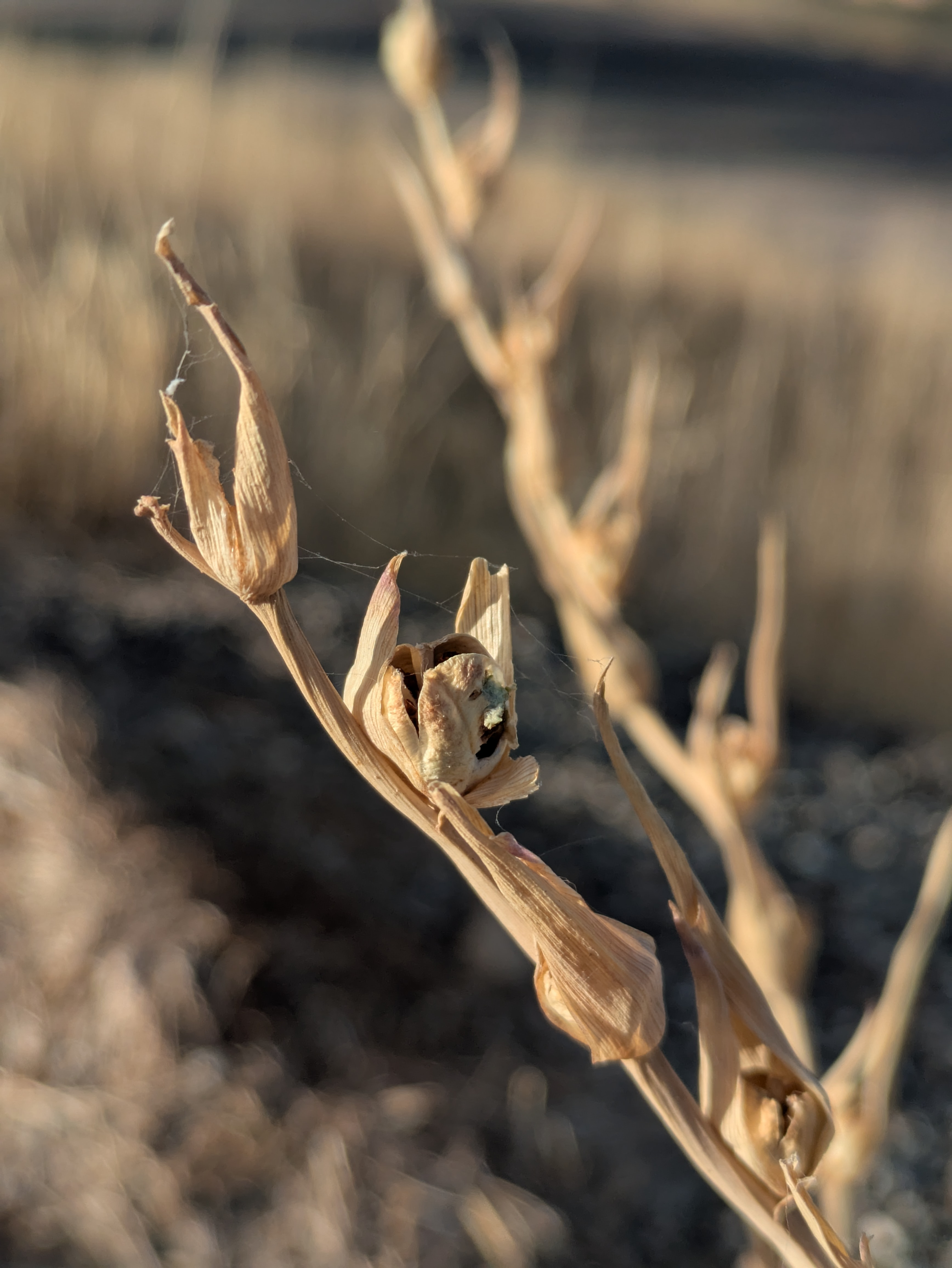
Seed Capsules of Gladiolus Italicus, Behbahan

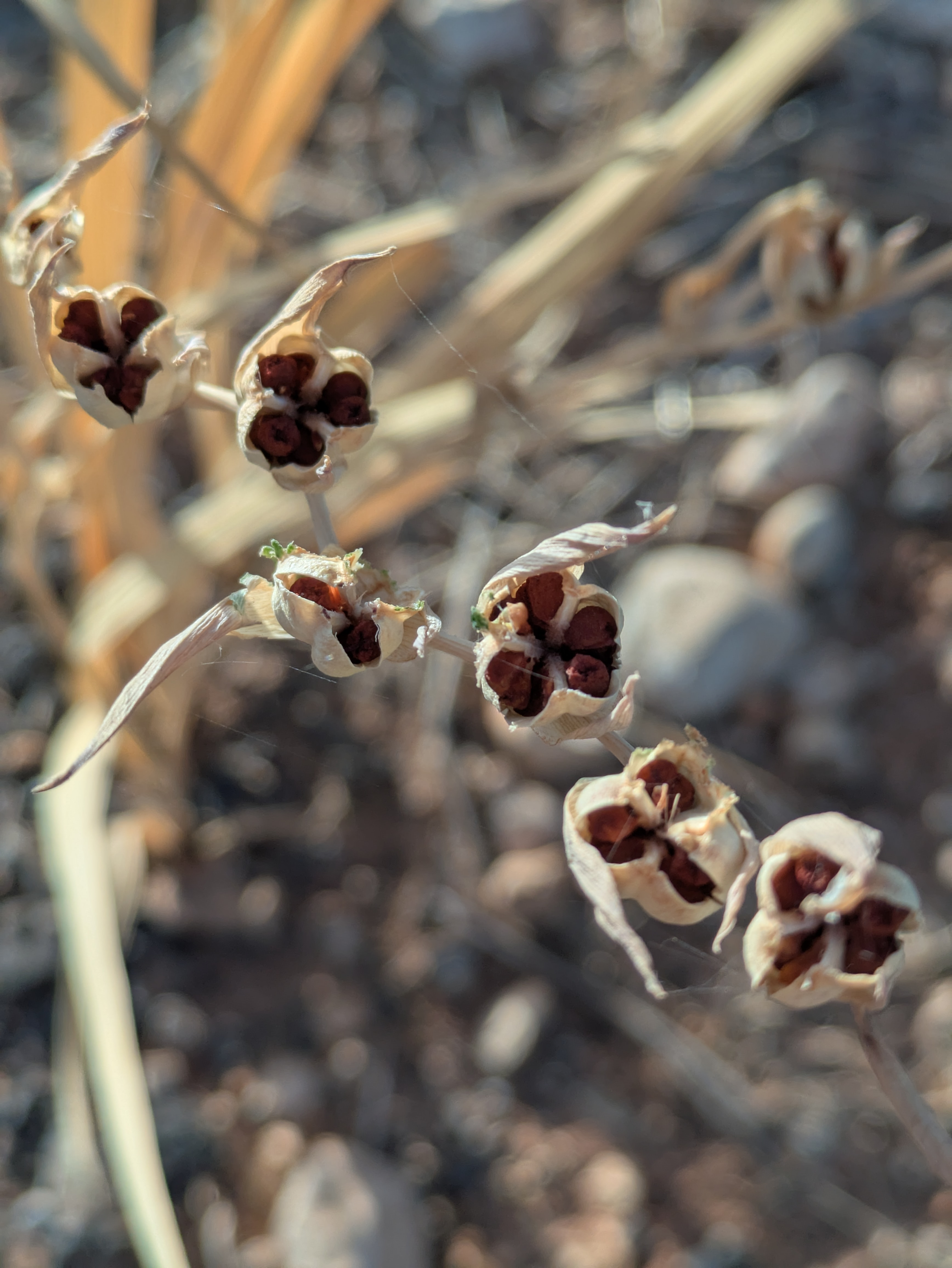
Seeds of Gladiolus Italicus, Behbahan

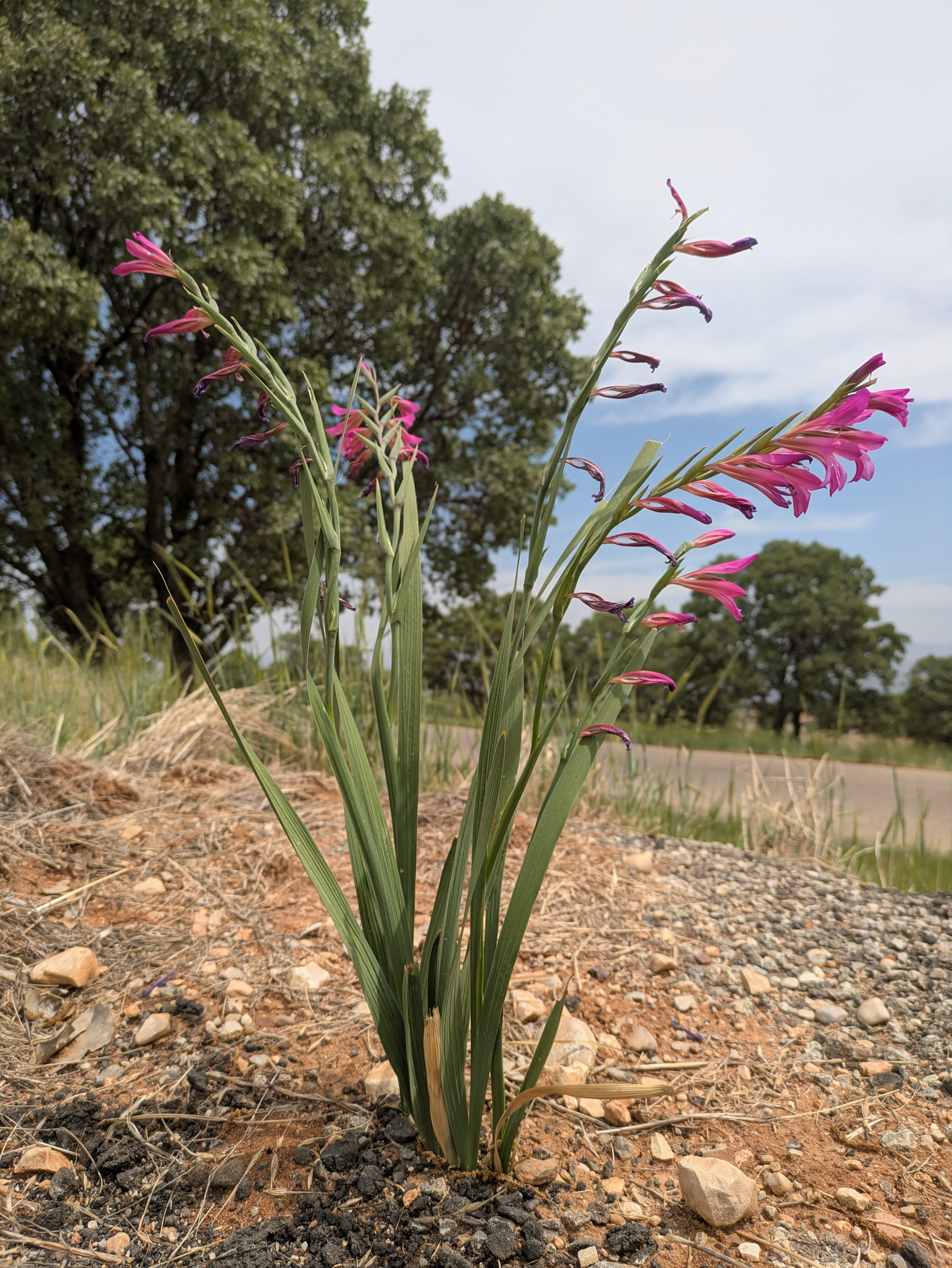
Gladiolus Italicus, Fars Province, Iran
