= List of Hydrocotyle species =

Hydrocotyle is a genus of plants in the family Araliaceae with a cosmipolitan distribution. As of November 2025, Plants of the World Online accepts the following 182 species:

== A-B ==
- Hydrocotyle aconitifolia A.Rich.
- Hydrocotyle acuminata Urb.
- Hydrocotyle acutifolia Ruiz & Pav.
- Hydrocotyle acutiloba (F.Muell.) N.A.Wakef.
- Hydrocotyle adrianae M.Mend.
- Hydrocotyle alata A.Rich.
- Hydrocotyle alchemilloides A.Rich.
- Hydrocotyle algida N.A.Wakef.
- Hydrocotyle alpestris Gardner
- Hydrocotyle americana L.
- Hydrocotyle andina Cuatrec.
- Hydrocotyle apolobambensis M.Mend. & A.Fuentes
- Hydrocotyle aristeguietae Mathias & Constance
- Hydrocotyle asterocarpa A.J.Perkins
- Hydrocotyle barbarossa Cham. & Schltdl.
- Hydrocotyle benguetensis Elmer
- Hydrocotyle boliviana (Kuntze) Mathias
- Hydrocotyle bonariensis Comm. ex Lam.
- Hydrocotyle bonplandii A.Rich.
- Hydrocotyle bowlesioides Mathias & Constance
- Hydrocotyle bradei Rossbach
- Hydrocotyle brittonii Mathias
- Hydrocotyle burmanica Kurz

== C-F ==
- Hydrocotyle calcicola Y.H.Li
- Hydrocotyle callicarpa Bunge
- Hydrocotyle callicephala Cham.
- Hydrocotyle capillaris F.Muell.
- Hydrocotyle capitata Thouars
- Hydrocotyle chamaemorus Cham. & Schltdl.
- Hydrocotyle changanensis X.C.Du & Y.Ren
- Hydrocotyle chevalieri (Cherm.) Tardieu
- Hydrocotyle chiangdaoensis Murata
- Hydrocotyle comocarpa F.Muell.
- Hydrocotyle conferta Wight
- Hydrocotyle coriacea M.Mend.
- Hydrocotyle corynophora F.Muell.
- Hydrocotyle crassiuscula Tate
- Hydrocotyle cryptocarpa Speg.
- Hydrocotyle cuatrecasasii Mathias & Constance
- Hydrocotyle dahlgrenii Rose & Macbride
- Hydrocotyle decorata A.J.Perkins
- Hydrocotyle demissa A.R.Bean
- Hydrocotyle diantha DC.
- Hydrocotyle dichondroides Makino
- Hydrocotyle dielsiana H.Wolff
- Hydrocotyle digitata A.R.Bean & Henwood
- Hydrocotyle dimorphocarpa A.J.Perkins
- Hydrocotyle dipleura A.R.Bean
- Hydrocotyle domingensis Mathias & Constance
- Hydrocotyle eccentrica Britton
- Hydrocotyle eichleri A.J.Perkins
- Hydrocotyle elegans A.Rich.
- Hydrocotyle elongata A.Cunn. ex Hook.f.
- Hydrocotyle escondida M.Mend.
- Hydrocotyle exigua (Urb.) Malme
- Hydrocotyle feaniana F.Br.
- Hydrocotyle felipae M.Mend.
- Hydrocotyle filipes Mathias
- Hydrocotyle fontana A.R.Bean
- Hydrocotyle foveolata H.Eichler

== G-L ==
- Hydrocotyle galapagensis B.L.Rob.
- Hydrocotyle geraniifolia F.Muell.
- Hydrocotyle globiflora Ruiz & Pav.
- Hydrocotyle glochidiata Benth.
- Hydrocotyle gracilis Ruiz & Pav.
- Hydrocotyle grammatocarpa F.Muell.
- Hydrocotyle grossulariifolia Rusby
- Hydrocotyle grossularioides A.Rich.
- Hydrocotyle gunnerifolia Wedd.
- Hydrocotyle hederacea Mathias
- Hydrocotyle heteromeria A.Rich.
- Hydrocotyle heucherifolia Mathias
- Hydrocotyle hexagona Mathias
- Hydrocotyle himalaica P.K.Mukh.
- Hydrocotyle hirsuta Sw.
- Hydrocotyle hirta R.Br. ex A.Rich.
- Hydrocotyle hispidula Bunge
- Hydrocotyle hitchcockii Rose ex Mathias
- Hydrocotyle hookeri (C.B.Clarke) Craib
- Hydrocotyle humboldtii A.Rich.
- Hydrocotyle humifusa Pohl ex DC.
- Hydrocotyle humilis S.S.Ying
- Hydrocotyle hydrophila Petrie
- Hydrocotyle incrassata Ruiz & Pav.
- Hydrocotyle indecora DC.
- Hydrocotyle inops A.R.Bean
- Hydrocotyle itatiaiensis Brade
- Hydrocotyle javanica Thunb.
- Hydrocotyle juanae M.Mend.
- Hydrocotyle kollimalayensis Karupp. & M.A.Ali
- Hydrocotyle lalashanensis S.S.Ying
- Hydrocotyle langsdorffii DC.
- Hydrocotyle lanipes Urb. & Ekman
- Hydrocotyle laxiflora DC.
- Hydrocotyle lehmannii Mathias
- Hydrocotyle lemnoides Benth.
- Hydrocotyle leucocephala Cham. & Schltdl.
- Hydrocotyle longipedunculata M.Mend.
- Hydrocotyle longipes Mathias & Killip
- Hydrocotyle lopeziae M.Mend.
- Hydrocotyle loshanensis S.S.Ying

== M-P ==
- Hydrocotyle maculosa A.R.Bean
- Hydrocotyle mannii Hook.f.
- Hydrocotyle medicaginoides Turcz.
- Hydrocotyle mexicana Schltdl. & Cham.
- Hydrocotyle microphylla A.Cunn.
- Hydrocotyle miranda A.R.Bean & Henwood
- Hydrocotyle modesta Cham. & Schltdl.
- Hydrocotyle moschata G.Forst.
- Hydrocotyle multifida A.Rich.
- Hydrocotyle muriculata Turcz.
- Hydrocotyle muscosa R.Br. ex A.Rich.
- Hydrocotyle new-guinensis M.Hiroe
- Hydrocotyle nixoides Mathias & Constance
- Hydrocotyle novae-zeelandiae DC.
- Hydrocotyle × nubigena Lucas Rodr.
- Hydrocotyle oligantha Urb.
- Hydrocotyle oraria A.R.Bean
- Hydrocotyle palacea (Urb.) Nery & Fiaschi
- Hydrocotyle palmata Mathias
- Hydrocotyle paludosa A.R.Bean
- Hydrocotyle papilionella A.J.Perkins
- Hydrocotyle pedicellosa F.Muell. ex Benth.
- Hydrocotyle peltiformis R.Li & H.Li
- Hydrocotyle pennellii Rose ex Mathias
- Hydrocotyle perforata A.J.Perkins
- Hydrocotyle perplexa A.J.Perkins
- Hydrocotyle peruviana H.Wolff
- Hydrocotyle petelotii Tardieu
- Hydrocotyle phoenix A.J.Perkins
- Hydrocotyle pilifera Turcz.
- Hydrocotyle plebeya R.Br. ex A.Rich.
- Hydrocotyle poeppigii DC.
- Hydrocotyle pseudoboliviana M.Mend.
- Hydrocotyle pseudoconferta Masam.
- Hydrocotyle pseudosanicula H.Boissieu
- Hydrocotyle pterocarpa F.Muell.
- Hydrocotyle pusilla A.Rich.
- Hydrocotyle pygmaea C.Wright

== Q-Z ==
- Hydrocotyle quinqueloba Ruiz & Pav.
- Hydrocotyle quinqueradiata (Urb.) Nery & Fiaschi
- Hydrocotyle ramiflora Maxim.
- Hydrocotyle ranunculoides L.f.
- Hydrocotyle ribifolia Rose & Standl.
- Hydrocotyle rivularis H.Eichler ex Henwood
- Hydrocotyle robusta Kirk
- Hydrocotyle rugulosa Turcz.
- Hydrocotyle sagasteguii Constance & M.O.Dillon
- Hydrocotyle salwinica R.H.Shan & S.L.Liou
- Hydrocotyle schlechteri H.Wolff
- Hydrocotyle scutellifera Benth.
- Hydrocotyle serendipita A.J.Perkins
- Hydrocotyle setulosa Hayata
- Hydrocotyle siamica Craib
- Hydrocotyle sibthorpioides Lam.
- Hydrocotyle simulans A.J.Perkins
- Hydrocotyle solomonii M.Mend.
- Hydrocotyle sphenoloba Wedd.
- Hydrocotyle spinulifera A.J.Perkins
- Hydrocotyle steyermarkii Mathias & Constance
- Hydrocotyle striata Benth.
- Hydrocotyle sulcata C.J.Webb & P.N.Johnson
- Hydrocotyle tambalomaensis H.Wolff
- Hydrocotyle tenerrima Rose ex Mathias
- Hydrocotyle tetragonocarpa Bunge
- Hydrocotyle tonkinensis Tardieu
- Hydrocotyle torresiana Rose & Standl.
- Hydrocotyle trachycarpa F.Muell.
- Hydrocotyle tripartita R.Br. ex A.Rich.
- Hydrocotyle tuberculata A.J.Perkins
- Hydrocotyle tumida A.R.Bean & Henwood
- Hydrocotyle ulei H.Wolff
- Hydrocotyle umbellata L.
- Hydrocotyle urbaniana H.Wolff
- Hydrocotyle venezuelensis Rose ex Mathias
- Hydrocotyle verticillata Thunb.
- Hydrocotyle vestita Mathias & Killip
- Hydrocotyle vulgaris L.
- Hydrocotyle wilfordii Maxim.
- Hydrocotyle wilsonii Diels ex R.H.Shan & S.L.Liou
- Hydrocotyle yabei Makino
- Hydrocotyle yanghuangensis (Hieron.) Mathias
- Hydrocotyle zongoana M.Mend.
