= G. grandis =

G. grandis may refer to:

- Gahnia grandis, a perennial plant species found in southeastern Australia and Tasmania
- Geosaurus grandis, an extinct marine crocodyliform species that lived during the Late Jurassic to the Early Cretaceous
- Gilbertsmithia grandis, an alga species in the genus Gilbertsmithia
- Glechoma grandis, a flowering plant species in the genus Glechoma
- Glirodon grandis, an extinct mammal species found in North America that lived during the Upper Jurassic

== See also ==
- Grandis (disambiguation)
