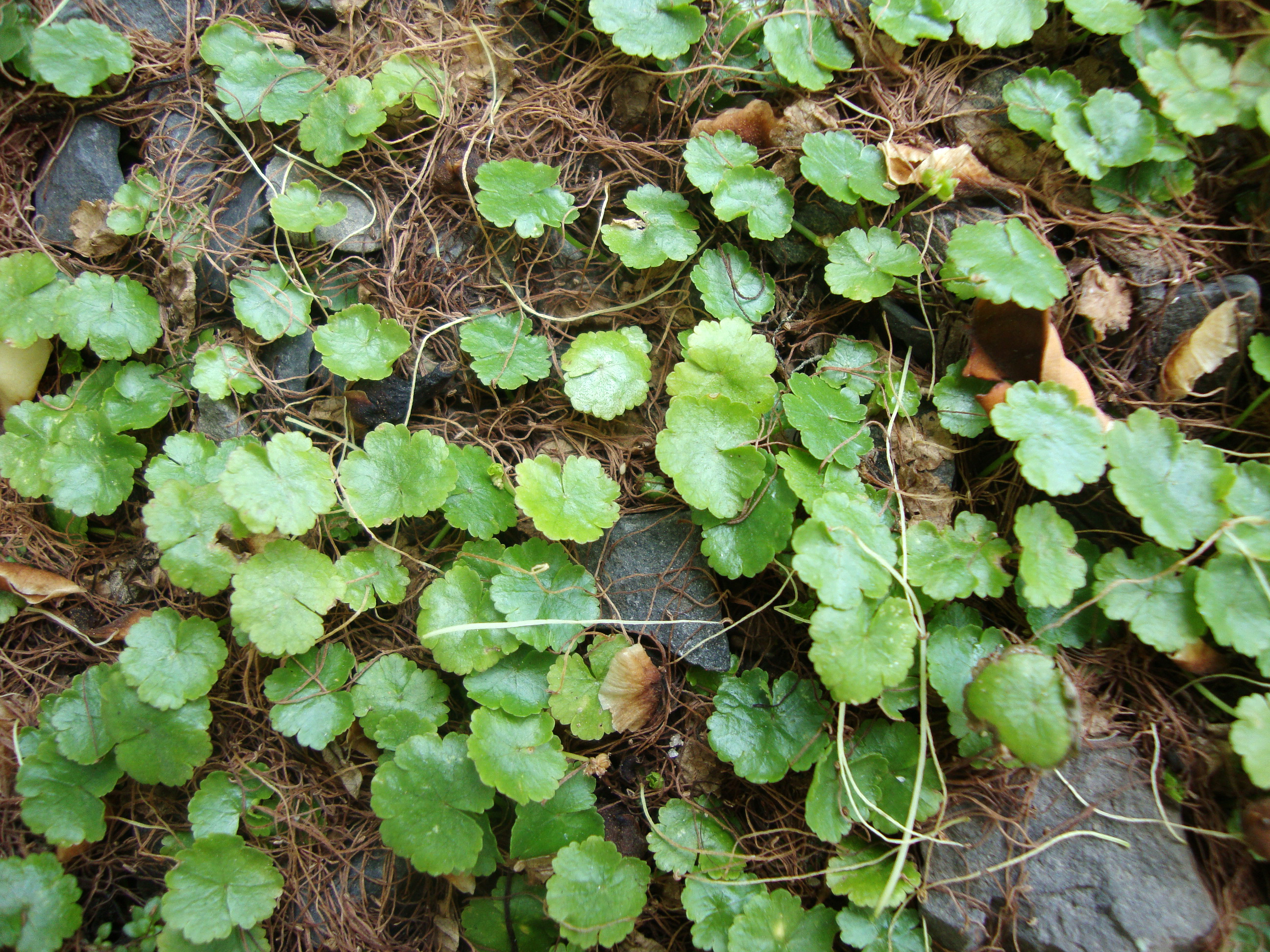

Scientific classification
- Kingdom: Plantae
- Clade: Tracheophytes
- Clade: Angiosperms
- Clade: Eudicots
- Clade: Asterids
- Order: Apiales
- Family: Araliaceae
- Genus: Hydrocotyle
- Species: H. sibthorpioides

Binomial name
- Hydrocotyle sibthorpioides Lam.

Synonyms
- Chondrocarpus sibthorpioides Sweet; Hydrocotyle keelungensis Liu, Chao & Chuang; Hydrocotyle monticola Hook. f.; Hydrocotyle rotundifolia Roxb. ex DC.; Hydrocotyle tenella Buch.-Ham. ex D. Don; Hydrocotyle tuberifera Ohwi

= Hydrocotyle sibthorpioides =

Lawn marshpennywort

Species of flowering plant

Hydrocotyle sibthorpioides is a small species of flowering plant native to southeastern Asia. It is also referred to as lawn marshpennywort. It is a dicot, formerly placed in the family Apiaceae, but more recently shown to belong in the Araliaceae. It grows in abundance when the conditions are right. Hydrocotyle sibthorpioides originated in southeastern Asia, but is slowly spreading in the United States, along with other places around the world. It can grow in a wide variety of habitats. It has been used for medicinal purposes in Asia and is also common in the aquarium trade.

== Description ==
The leaf width ranges from 0.5 to 2 cm. The plant has a moderate growth rate and produces small flowers. The flowers are a faint yellow with a hint of purple. Flower clusters are simple and flat topped or rounded. There are inconspicuous involucral bracts at the base of each flower and indistinct sepals. The leaves are simple, with a small leafy outgrowth at the base, and kidney-shaped to round. Leaf edges are scalloped. The leaves are broad and alternate. The peltate leaves are often described as egg-shaped; all of the leaves are hairless and they often have five to seven shallow lobes around the edge. Fruits are flat and break in half when the plant reaches maturity. Once the fruit has broken open, there is one seed on each side. The fruits are elliptical to round with thin ridges and no oil tubes (vitta), which is characteristic in the fruit of umbelliferous plants.

== Taxonomy ==
Hydrocotyle sibthorpioides is traditionally treated within the family Apiaceae, although recent results place it in the Araliaceae. A moleculary phylogeny shows H. sibthorpioides to be closely related to H. americana, H. bonariensis, H. bowlesioides, H. hirsute, and H. umbellata, among others.

== Distribution and habitat ==
Hydrocoytle sibthorpioides is most common in southeastern Asia. Although it is native to Asia, there are parts of the United States where this plant thrives as an introduced species, particularly in the eastern US and some areas in California. Recently, it has been reported to flourish in southeast Australia, where it occurs in Brisbane and Sydney, is native to Western Australia. This species is able to grow in a wide variety of habitats, from dry areas to locations that are occasionally submerged. It can also be found between sidewalk cracks, and is increasingly occurring as a lawn weed.

== Culture ==
For the plant to reach its full growth it must have full sunlight. It can tolerate temperatures between 10 and 30°C, but grows best when the temperature stays between 20 and 28°C. It has a soil pH preference of 5 to 7. Propagation of this plant is mostly by cuttings.

== Conservation status ==
The conservation status for H. sibthorpioides is of least concern; it continues to grow and spread throughout the United States along with other regions of the world such as Australia.

== Chemical composition ==
Phytochemical investigations identified and isolated 50 phytoconstituents from the plant, of which asiaticoside and madecasoside were the chief constituents. Phytoconstituents isolated were camphene, genistein, hydrocosisaponin A-F, hydrocotyloside I-VII, isorhamnetin, l-sesamin, ocimene, phytol, quercetin, hyperoside, quercetin 3-(6-caffeoylgalactoside), stigmasterol, stigmasterol isomers, trans-β-farnesene, udosaponin B, α-humulene, α-pinene, β-caryophyllene, and β-pinene. Other compounds identified by HPLC analysis are 2-ethylacridine, 2-methyl-3-O-tolyl-6-hydroxy-4(3H)-quinazolinone, 3-(4-(hydroxymethyl)phenyl)-2-ethylquinazolin-4(3H)-one, demecolcine, 9,10,10-trimethyl-9,10-dihydroanthracene, rosmarinic acid, chlorogenic acid, catechin, epicatechin, quercetin, biochanin A, rutin, gallic acid, ferulic acid, caffeic acid, ascorbic acid, and α-tocopherol.

== Use in traditional medicine ==
Many tribes in the world use H. sibthorpioides to treat fever, edoema, dysentery, rheumatalgia, whooping cough, jaundice, throat discomfort, psoriasis, herpes zoster infection, hepatitis-B infection, calming pain, dysmenorrhoea, and carbunculosis. In Assam, it is also employed as a hepatoprotective agent, a brain tonic, and a detoxifying agent. Bengali villagers use the entire plant for bone fractures. Extracts of this plant have been found to be free from toxicity up to a dose of 2000 mg/kg in rats. In Chinese traditional medicine, it is known as Jiangxi Jinqiancao.

== Toxicity ==
The phytoconstituents of H. sibthorpioides have shown a wide range of therapeutic utility, although pharmacological use is only justified if it has a satisfactory safety profile. There is no indication that the plant or its extracts have ever been tested in a clinical experiment. Following OECD standards 425, Hazarika et al. (2019) conducted a preclinical acute toxicity investigation on several extracts of H. sibthorpioides using albino rats, and found that the LD_{50} was larger than 2000 mg/kg of body weight.
