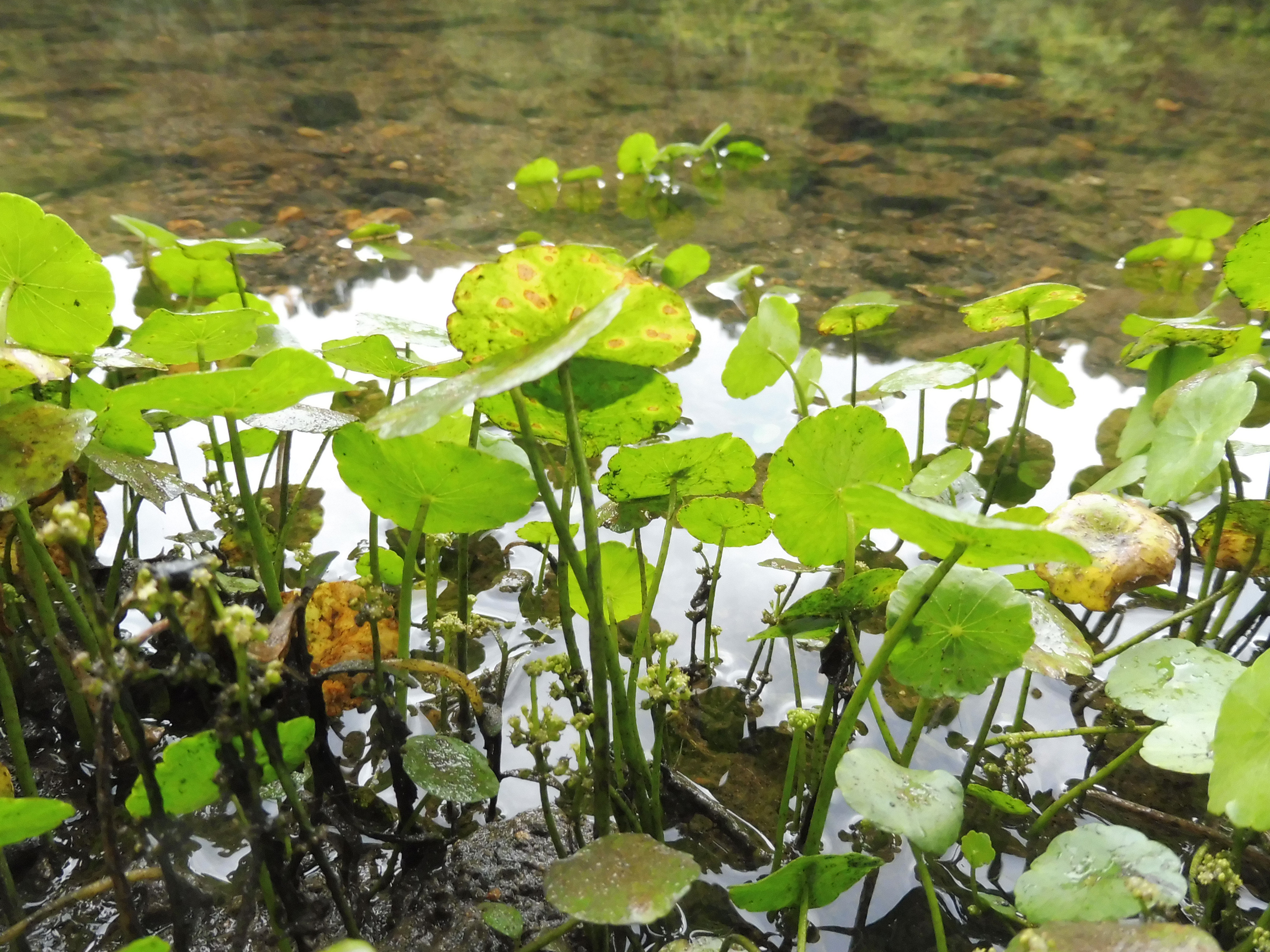

Scientific classification
- Kingdom: Plantae
- Clade: Tracheophytes
- Clade: Angiosperms
- Clade: Eudicots
- Clade: Asterids
- Order: Apiales
- Family: Araliaceae
- Genus: Hydrocotyle
- Species: H. prolifera

Binomial name
- Hydrocotyle prolifera Kellogg

= Hydrocotyle prolifera =

Species of flowering plant

Hydrocotyle prolifera, commonly called whorled marshpennywort , is a species of flowering plant in the ginseng family (Araliaceae). It is native to North America and South America, where it is widespread. In the United States, it is largely restricted to the southeastern and southwestern regions. Its natural habitat is in swamp forests, or in pools of standing water.

Hydrocotyle prolifera is an herbaceous perennial that grows as an emergent aquatic plant. It flowers from May through August. It can be distinguished from the similar looking Hydrocotyle verticillata by its pedicellate flowers and fruits, in contrast to the sessile of subsessile flowers and fruits of H. verticillata.
