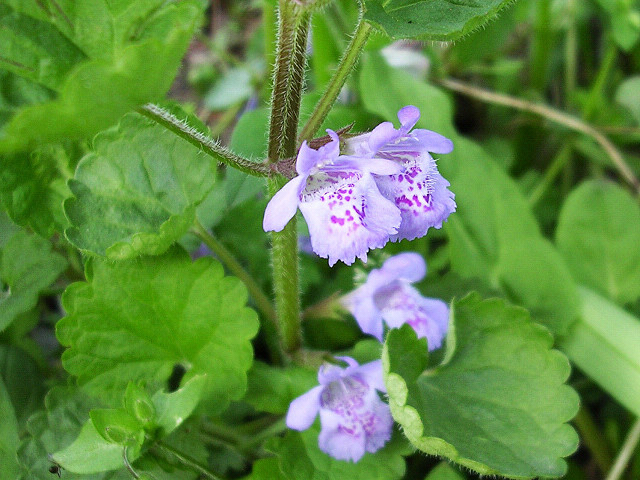
- Here given as Glechoma hederacea subsp. grandis
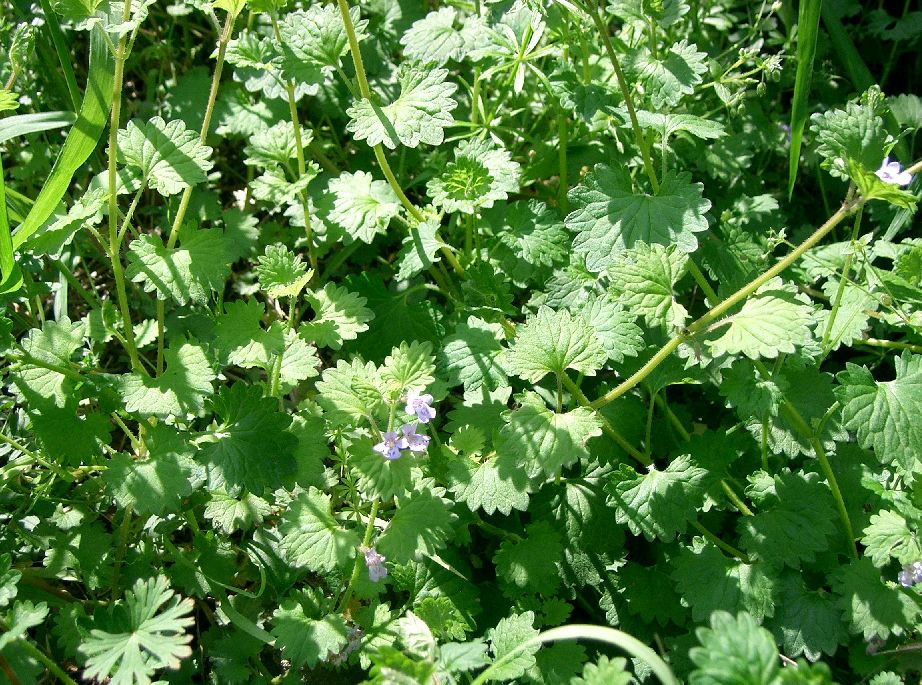
- Foliage

Scientific classification
- Kingdom: Plantae
- Clade: Tracheophytes
- Clade: Angiosperms
- Clade: Eudicots
- Clade: Asterids
- Order: Lamiales
- Family: Lamiaceae
- Genus: Glechoma
- Species: G. grandis

Binomial name
- Glechoma grandis (A.Gray) Kuprian.

Synonyms
- Glechoma hederacea f. albiflorens S.S.Ying; Glechoma hederacea var. grandis (A.Gray) Kudô; Glechoma hederacea subsp. grandis (A.Gray) H.Hara; Nepeta glechoma var. grandis A.Gray

= Glechoma grandis =

Species of plant

Glechoma grandis is a species of flowering plant in the family Lamiaceae, native to southeastern China, Taiwan, and Japan. Although similar to Glechoma hederacea (ground-ivy, creeping charlie), it is a distinctive species. A perennial reaching 20 cm (8 in), it is found in wet areas and near houses.
