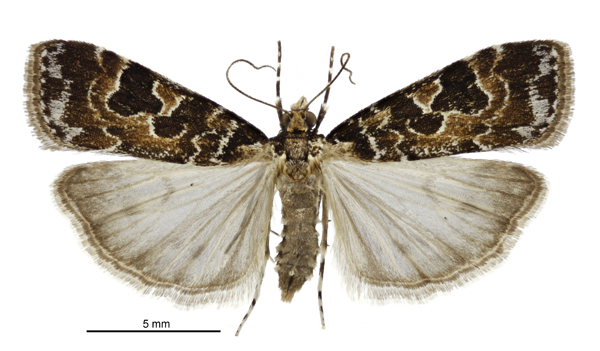
- Female
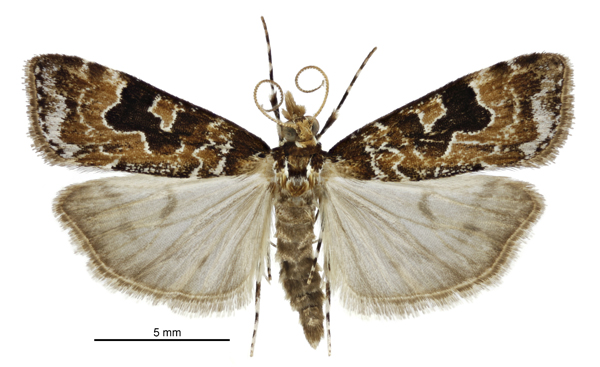
- Male

Scientific classification
- Kingdom: Animalia
- Phylum: Arthropoda
- Clade: Pancrustacea
- Class: Insecta
- Order: Lepidoptera
- Family: Crambidae
- Genus: Scoparia
- Species: S. ustimacula

Binomial name
- Scoparia ustimacula C. Felder, R. Felder & Rogenhofer, 1875

Synonyms
- Scoparia conifera Butler, 1879

= Scoparia ustimacula =

Species of insect

Scoparia ustimacula, also known as the black-marked brown Scoparia moth, is a species of moth in the family Crambidae. It was described by Cajetan Felder, Rudolf Felder and Alois Friedrich Rogenhofer in 1875. It is endemic to New Zealand and can be found in the North, South and Stewart Islands. This species inhabits dense native forest at altitudes from sea level to approximately 1000 m. Although little is known of the life history of this species, larvae have been observed feeding on Hydrocotyle species. Adults are on the wing year round but are more commonly observed from September to March. Adults are nocturnal, are attracted to light and have been collected by beating scrub.

== Taxonomy ==
This species was first described by Cajetan Felder, Rudolf Felder and Alois Friedrich Rogenhofer in 1875 using specimens collected in Nelson by T. R. Oxley. Arthur Gardiner Butler, thinking he was describing a new species, named it Scoparia conifera in 1879. Edward Meyrick synonymised this name in 1884 and detailed the reasons for this decision in 1885. George Hudson described and illustrated the species in his 1928 book The butterflies and moths of New Zealand. The male holotype is held at the Natural History Museum, London.

== Description ==
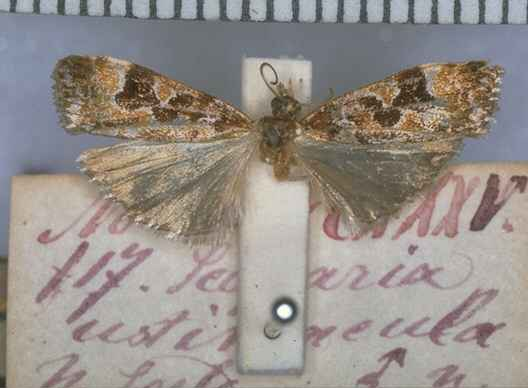
S. ustimacula holotype

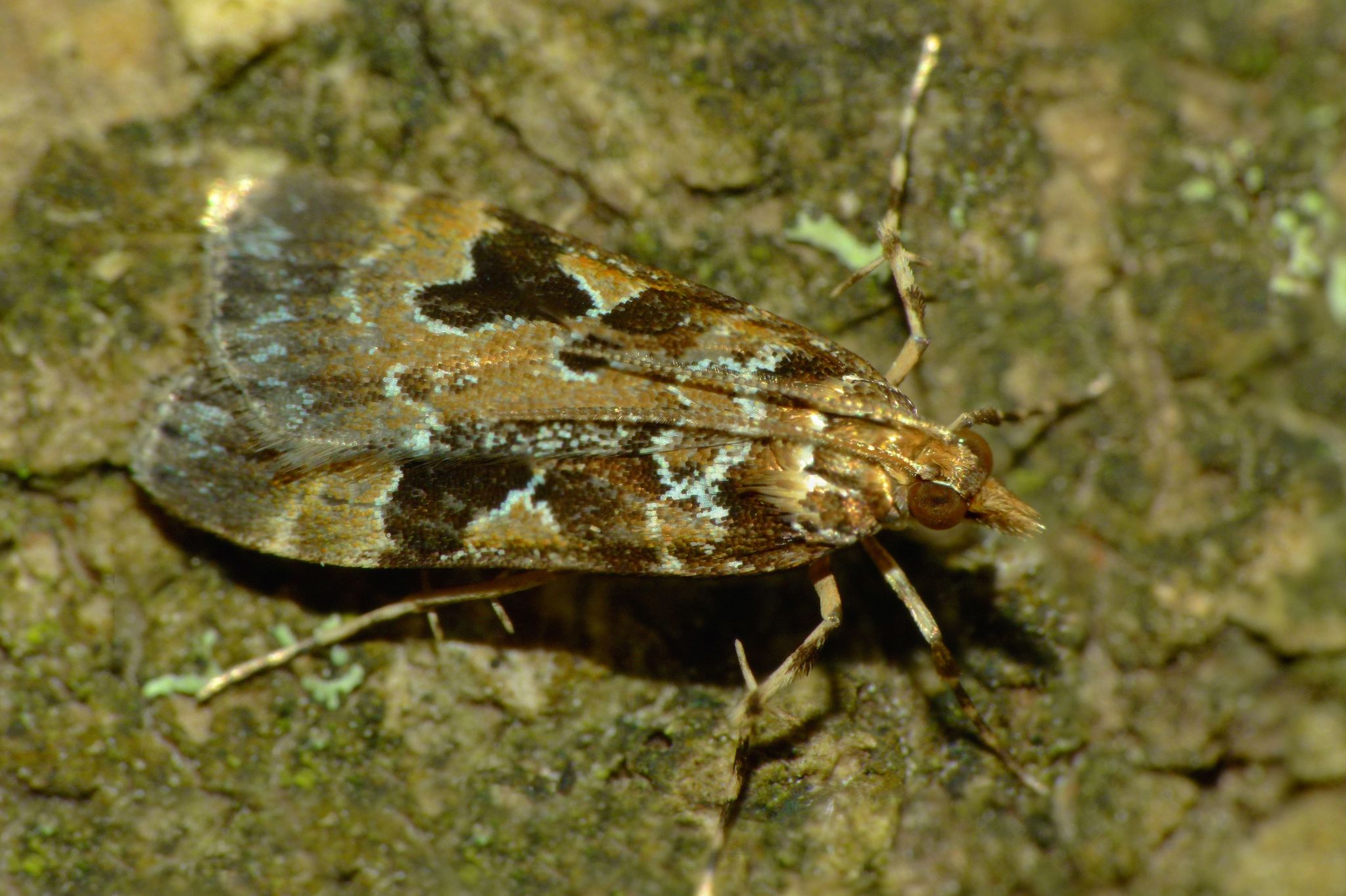
Observation of a live moth.

Hudson described this species as follows:

The expansion of the wings is a little over 3/4 inch. The fore-wings are bright golden-brown and very glossy with dark brown markings edged with white; there is a small brown patch at the base; the first line is very slender, white, faintly edged with brown towards the termen; the orbicular and claviform are very large, touching, dark brown edged with white; the reniform is extremely large and conspicuous, very dark brown edged with white; the second line is white and very slender; the sub-terminal line is broad, white, broken near the middle and rather irregular; there is a terminal series of blackish marks. The hind-wings are pale och eous, glossy, with a grey discal spot and terminal shading.

This moth is distinctive in appearance and tends to be larger when collected at higher altitudes. S. ustimacula can be distinguished by the pair of large, dark brown, white boarded, forewing markings. Sometimes these patches join to form an M shape. The male of this species has long antennal ciliations.

== Distribution ==
This species is endemic to New Zealand and is found throughout the country. It is regarded as being fairly common.

== Habitat ==
S. ustimacula inhabits dense native forested areas and can be collected by beating the scrub and overhanging forest branches. This species can be found at altitudes from sea level up to approximately 1000 m.

== Behaviour ==
The adults of this species are on the wing throughout the year but are more frequently seen from September to March. The adults active at night and are attracted to light. They have been collected via a mercury vapour light trap.

== Host species ==
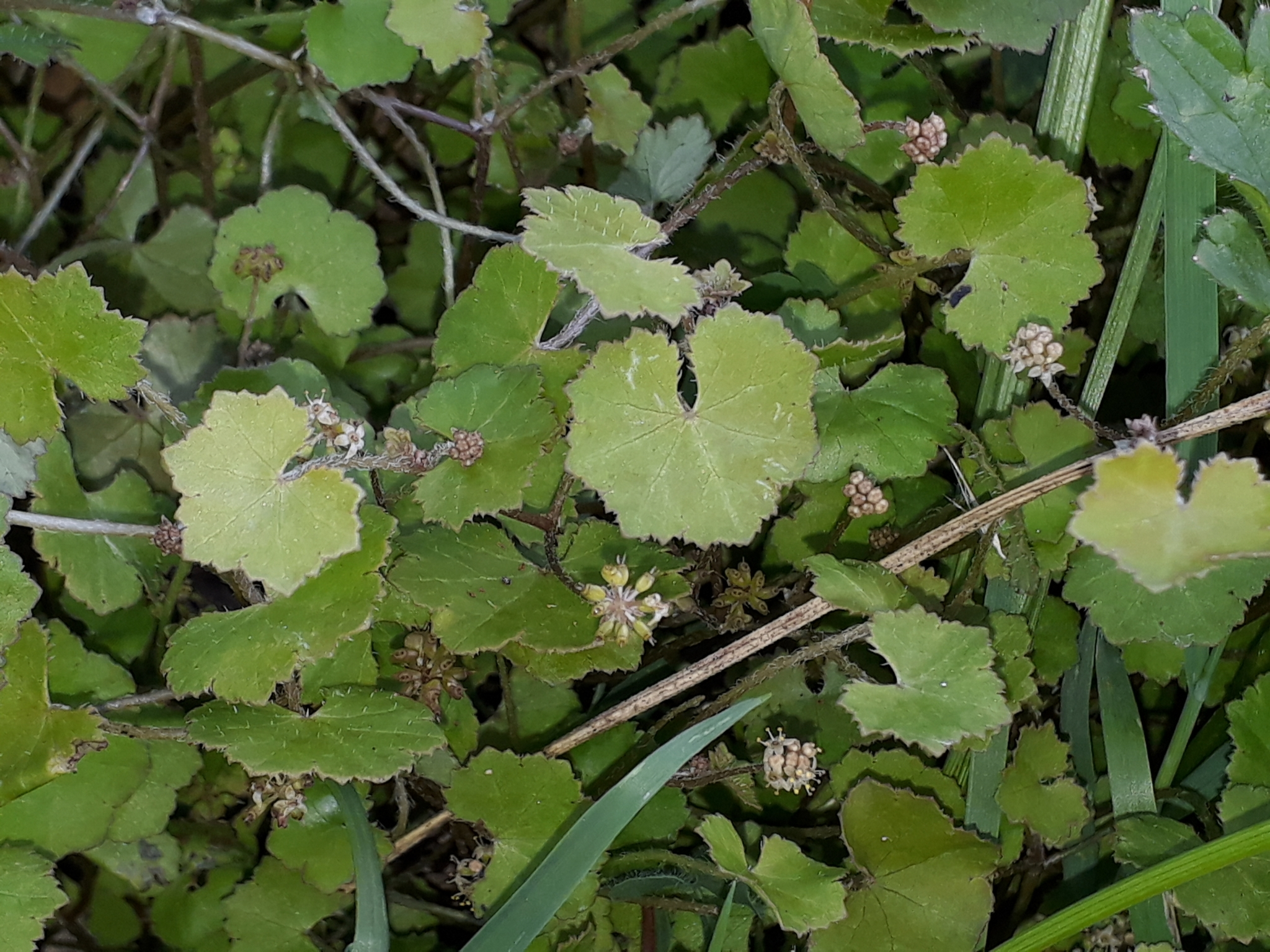
Possible host species Hydrocotyle novae-zeelandiae

Although little is known of the life history of this moth, the larvae of S. ustimacula feed on Hydrocotyle species.
