= Pennywort =

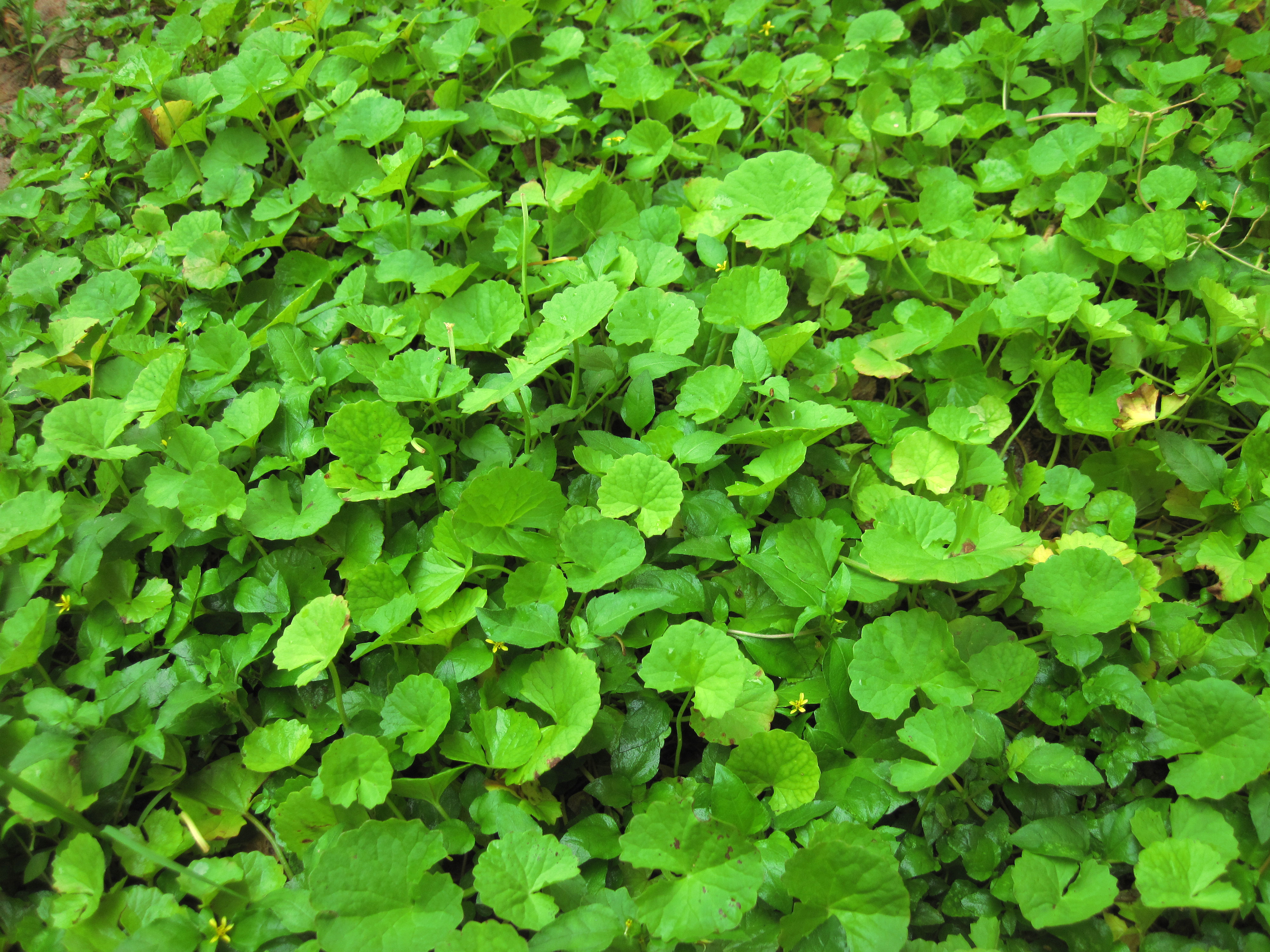
Asiatic pennywort

Pennywort is a common name given to several different plants around the world. In general they have round leaves and a low-growing habit. Pennywort may refer to:

- In Asia: the edible Asiatic pennywort, Centella asiatica, also known as centella, Indian pennywort, or gotukola.
- In Europe: Navelwort, Umbilicus rupestris (formerly Cotyledon umbilicus), known as penny-pies, wall pennywort, or kidneywort, a succulent, perennial flowering plant in the stonecrop family Crassulaceae.
- Water pennywort, the genus Hydrocotyle, known as floating pennywort, Indian pennywort, marsh penny, thick-leaved pennywort, or even white rot, aquatic or semi-aquatic plants such as the edible dollarweed, Hydrocotyle umbellata.
- Liver leaf, Anemone hepatica, also known as liverwort.
- Virginian pennywort, Obolaria virginica.
- Cymbalaria muralis.
- Cymbalaria aequitriloba, tiny ivy-like leaves with copious purple-pink flowers with yellow throats.
