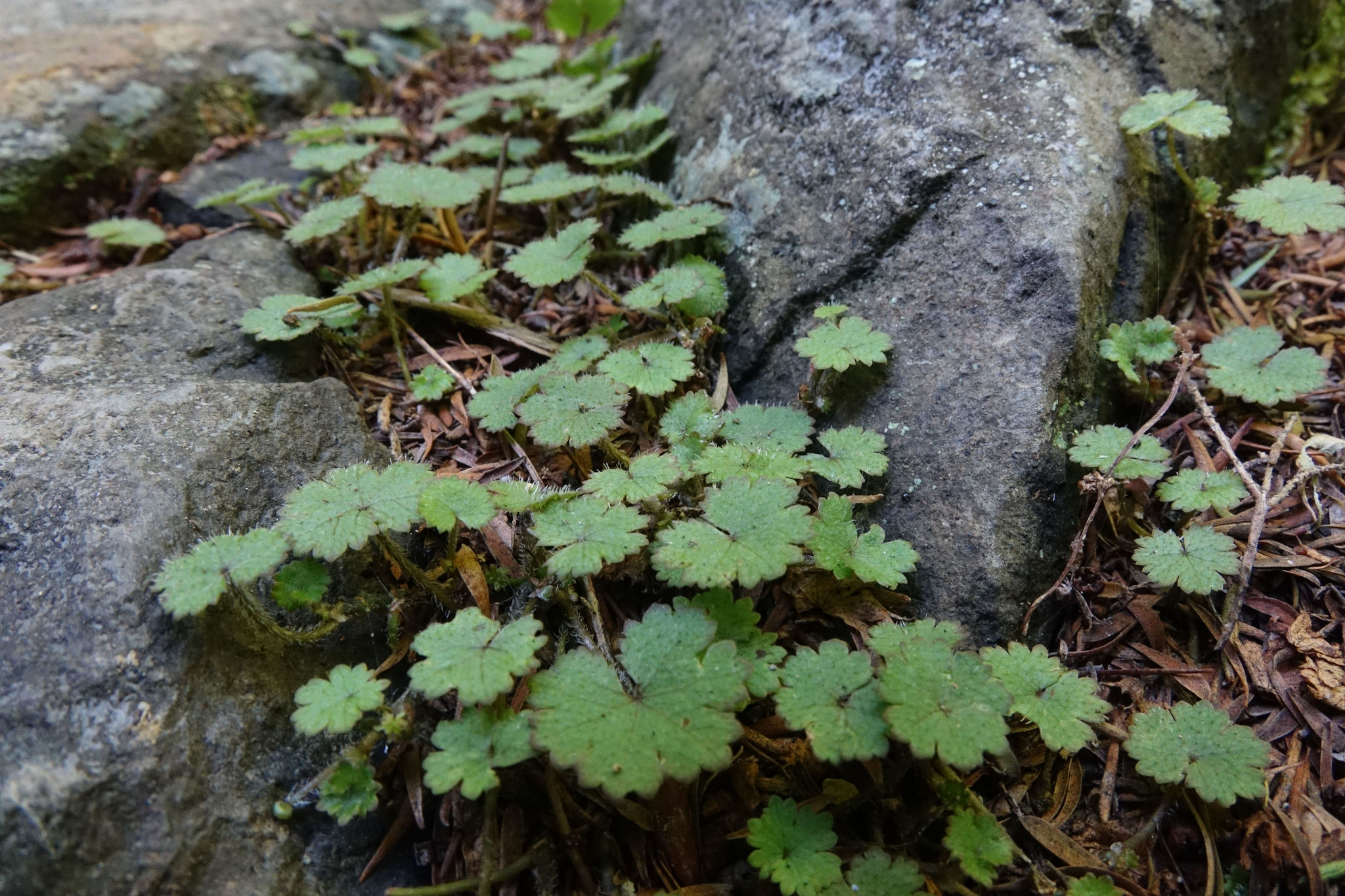
- Dunedin, New Zealand, 2018

Scientific classification
- Kingdom: Plantae
- Clade: Tracheophytes
- Clade: Angiosperms
- Clade: Eudicots
- Clade: Asterids
- Order: Apiales
- Family: Araliaceae
- Genus: Hydrocotyle
- Species: H. moschata

Binomial name
- Hydrocotyle moschata G.Forst.

= Hydrocotyle moschata =

Species of pennywort

Hydrocotyle moschata, also known as hairy pennywort or musky-marsh pennywort, is a species of water pennywort. Hairy pennywort is native to New Zealand, but has been introduced and naturalized elsewhere including California and Mozambique.

== Taxonomy ==
Hydrocotyle moschata contains the following varieties:

- Hydrocotyle moschata var. parvifolia
- Hydrocotyle moschata var. moschata

== Habitat ==
H. moschata grows on damp banks.
