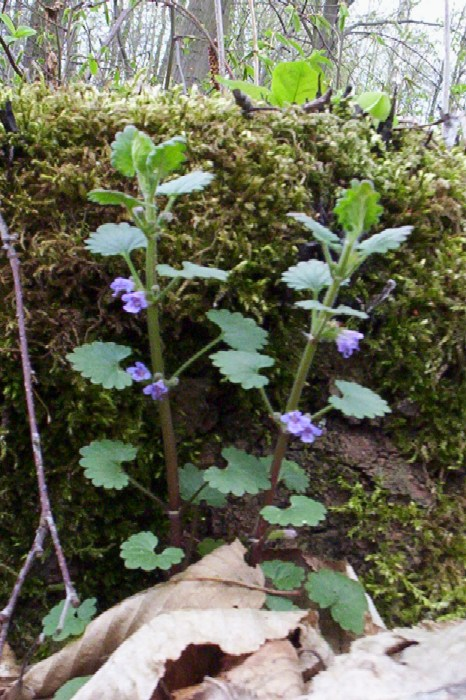
- Glechoma hederacea

Scientific classification
- Kingdom: Plantae
- Clade: Tracheophytes
- Clade: Angiosperms
- Clade: Eudicots
- Clade: Asterids
- Order: Lamiales
- Family: Lamiaceae
- Subfamily: Nepetoideae
- Tribe: Mentheae
- Genus: Glechoma; L.

Synonyms
- Chamaeclema Moench; Glechonion St.-Lag.; Chamaecissos Lunell; Meehaniopsis Kudô

= Glechoma =

Genus of flowering plants in the sage family

Glechoma is a genus of flowering plants in the mint family, Lamiaceae, first described for modern science in 1753. It is distributed in northern Asia and Europe with a center of diversity in Asia, especially China. One species is naturalized in New Zealand and in North America.

These plants are perennial herbs with stolons. The stems are prostrate or upright and bear leaf blades on long petioles. The inflorescences arising from the leaf axils have two to many flowers. The tubular corolla has two lobed lips, and is generally blue-violet. The genus is closely related to Marmoritis but closer still to Meehania, and some species have in the past been moved between the latter genus and Glechoma.

Species

1. Glechoma biondiana (Diels) C.Y.Wu & C.Chen – Gansu, Hebei, Henan, Hubei, Shaanxi, Sichuan
2. Glechoma grandis (A.Gray) Kuprianova – Japan, Taiwan, Jiangsu
3. Glechoma hederacea L. – ground-ivy, creeping charlie – much of Europe, much of Russia, Central Asia, Xinjiang; naturalized in New Zealand and North America
4. Glechoma hirsuta Waldst. & Kit. – eastern and southeastern Europe
5. Glechoma longituba (Nakai) Kuprian. – Vietnam, Korea, eastern + central China, Russian Far East (Amur, Primorye)
6. Glechoma × pannonica Borbás – eastern Russia, Ukraine, Hungary, Baltic Republics (G. hederacea × G. hirsuta)
7. Glechoma sardoa Halácsy & Wettst. – Sardinia
8. Glechoma sinograndis C.Y.Wu – Yunnan

== Etymology ==
Glechoma is said to derive from the Greek name glechon for pennyroyal, Mentha pulegium.

== Ecology ==
Insects found on Glechoma include the carpenter bee Xylocopa sinensis, which robs nectar from G. longituba.
