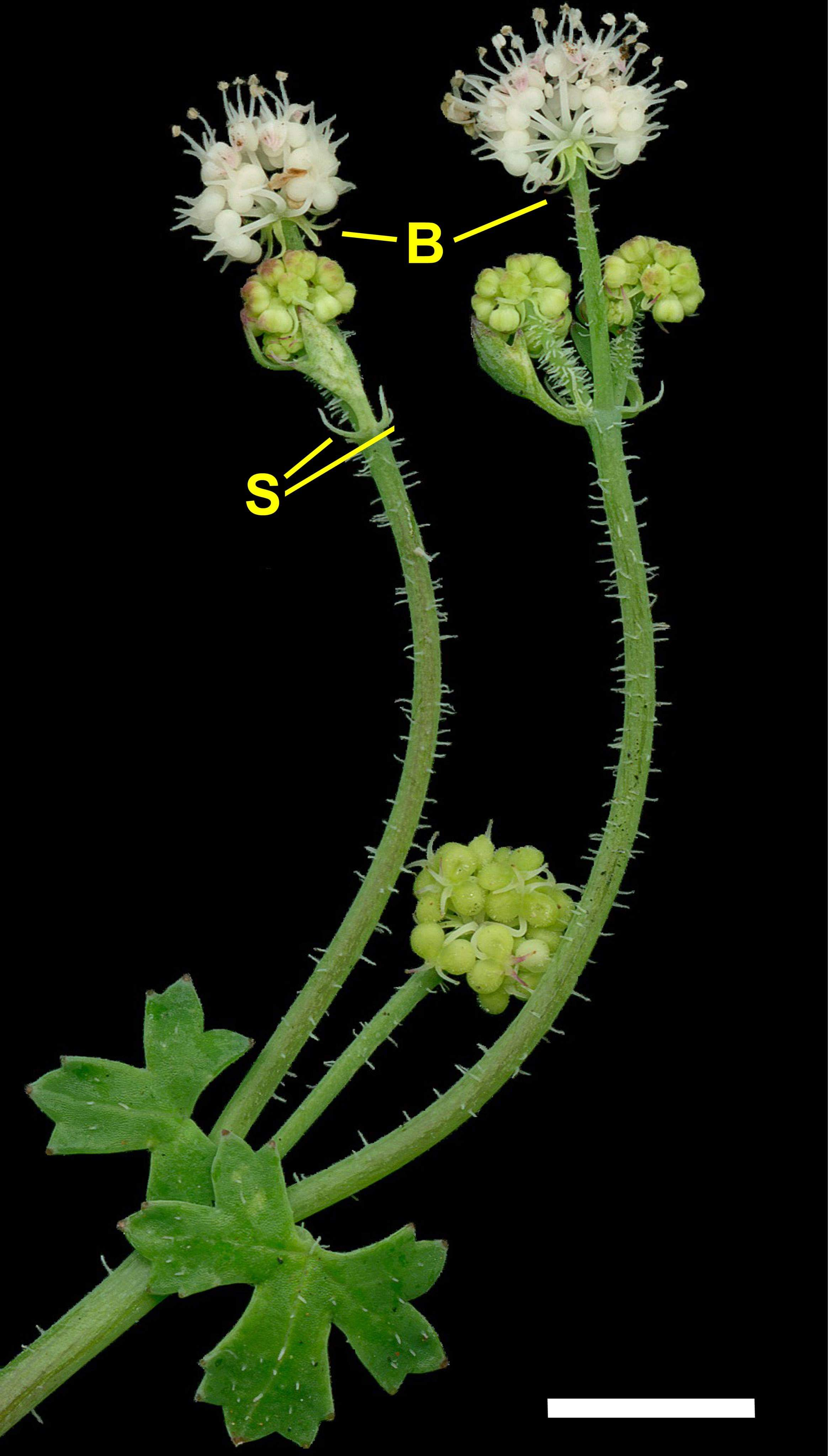
- Closeup photo of flowers and leaves. The scale bar is 5mm.

Conservation status
- Priority Two — Poorly Known Taxa (DEC)

Scientific classification
- Kingdom: Plantae
- Clade: Tracheophytes
- Clade: Angiosperms
- Clade: Eudicots
- Clade: Asterids
- Order: Apiales
- Family: Araliaceae
- Genus: Hydrocotyle
- Species: H. phoenix

Binomial name
- Hydrocotyle phoenix A.J.Perkins

= Hydrocotyle phoenix =

Fire pennywort

Species of plant

Hydrocotyle phoenix is a species of annual pennywort and is commonly called fire pennywort. It is only known to grow in south-west Australia, specifically in fire prone habitats; it is unique in this regard as it is the only species of Hydrocotyle known to have a fire adapted life-history. The specific epithet "phoenix" references this fire adapted life history as in Greek mythology, a phoenix experiences rebirth by rising from ashes, much like how this plant rises from the ashes after a wildfire.

== Description ==
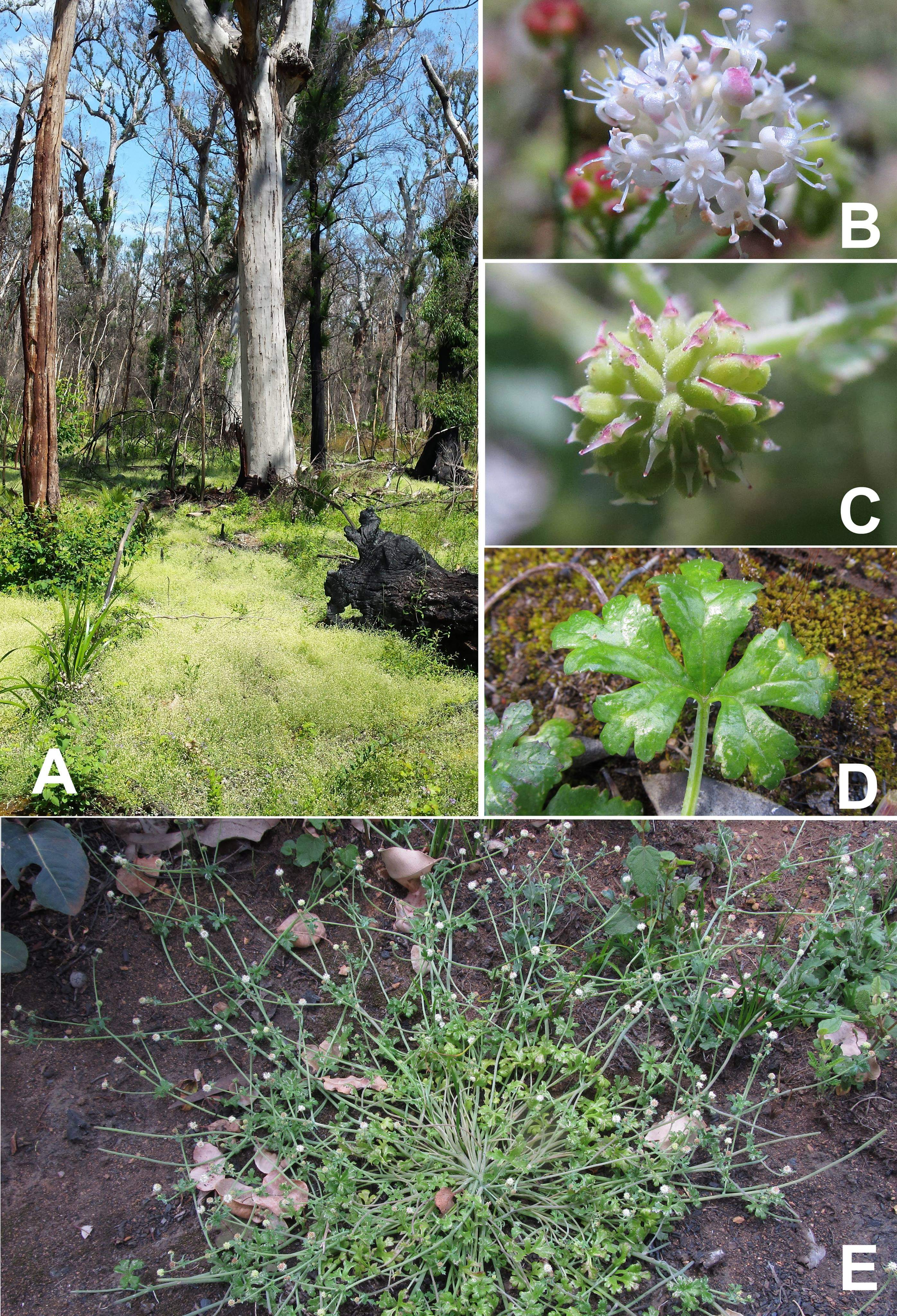
A. Habitat B. Umbel of flowers C. Fruiting umbel D. Typical leaf E. Habitat of fertile plants

Hydrocotyle phoenix is a low growing annual herb which grows 4–15 centimeters (1.6–5.9 in) tall and up to 100 centimeters (39 in) wide with a sprawling habit. The leaves grow from a basal rosette. The leaves are palmately lobed and 5-20 mm long by 7-26 mm wide and covered in small hairs. The flowers are borne in a compact umbel with about 10-20 flowers. The flowers themselves are small, only 4-6 mm wide, and white. The flowers have only 5 white petals and lack a calyx. The fruits are schizocarps about 1 mm in size.

Atypically for this group of plants, H. phoenix is a fire-ephemeral plant, meaning that it forms a soil seed bank in the soil and its germination is triggered by wildfire. It will typically not grow unless prompted by a wildfire. Like many plants from Australia, its life cycle requires fire.

Hydrocotyle phoenix was discovered in 2015. It is most morphologically most similar to Hydrocotyle hispidula, Hydrocotyle blepharocarpa, and Hydrocotyle geraniifolia. Its evolutionary position within Hydrocotyle has not yet been determined.

== Range ==
Hydrocotyle phoenix is only known from Karri Forest within D'Entrecasteaux National Park in Western Australia. The plant is locally abundant, but due to having a very small range, it is currently listed as Priority 2 as not enough data exists to ascribe it a conservation code.
