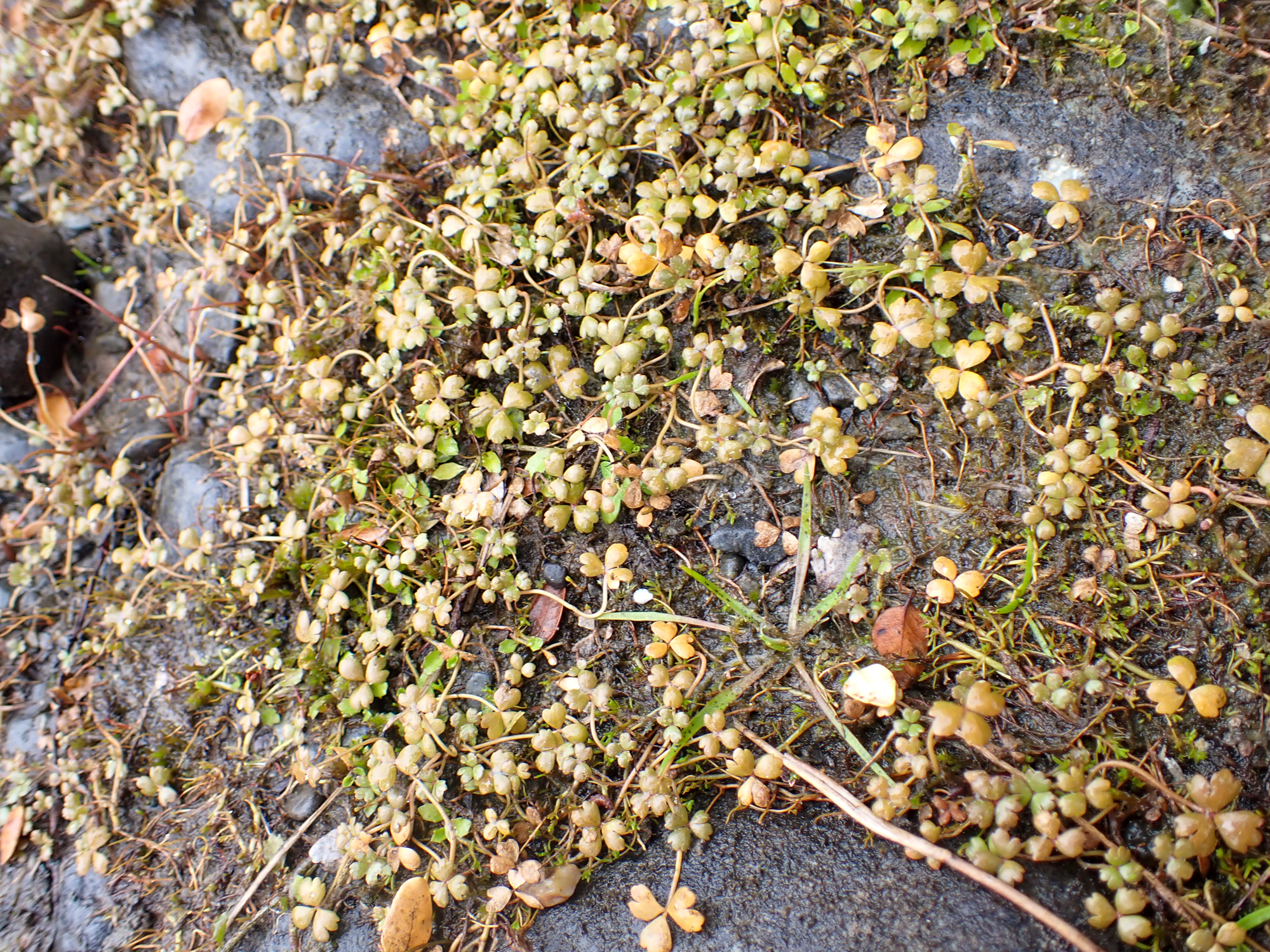
- Hydrocotyle sulcata in Nelson Lakes National Park

Conservation status
- Not Threatened (NZ TCS)

Scientific classification
- Kingdom: Plantae
- Clade: Tracheophytes
- Clade: Angiosperms
- Clade: Eudicots
- Clade: Asterids
- Order: Apiales
- Family: Araliaceae
- Genus: Hydrocotyle
- Species: H. sulcata

Binomial name
- Hydrocotyle sulcata C.J.Webb & P.N.Johnson

= Hydrocotyle sulcata =

Species of flowering plant

Hydrocotyle sulcata, also known as pennywort, is a species of plant.

== Description ==
A small plant, with tripartite leaves that are deeply grooved, and similar to Hydrocotyle hydrophila. The leaves are clover-like.

== Range and habitat ==
It is known from both the North and South Islands of New Zealand. H. sulcata grows in wet areas.

== Etymology ==
The name hydrocotyle is from the Greek hydro ‘water’ and cotyle ‘cup’, and is made in reference to the cup-like hollow at the base of the leaf. Sulcata is from the Latin sulcus 'furrow'.
