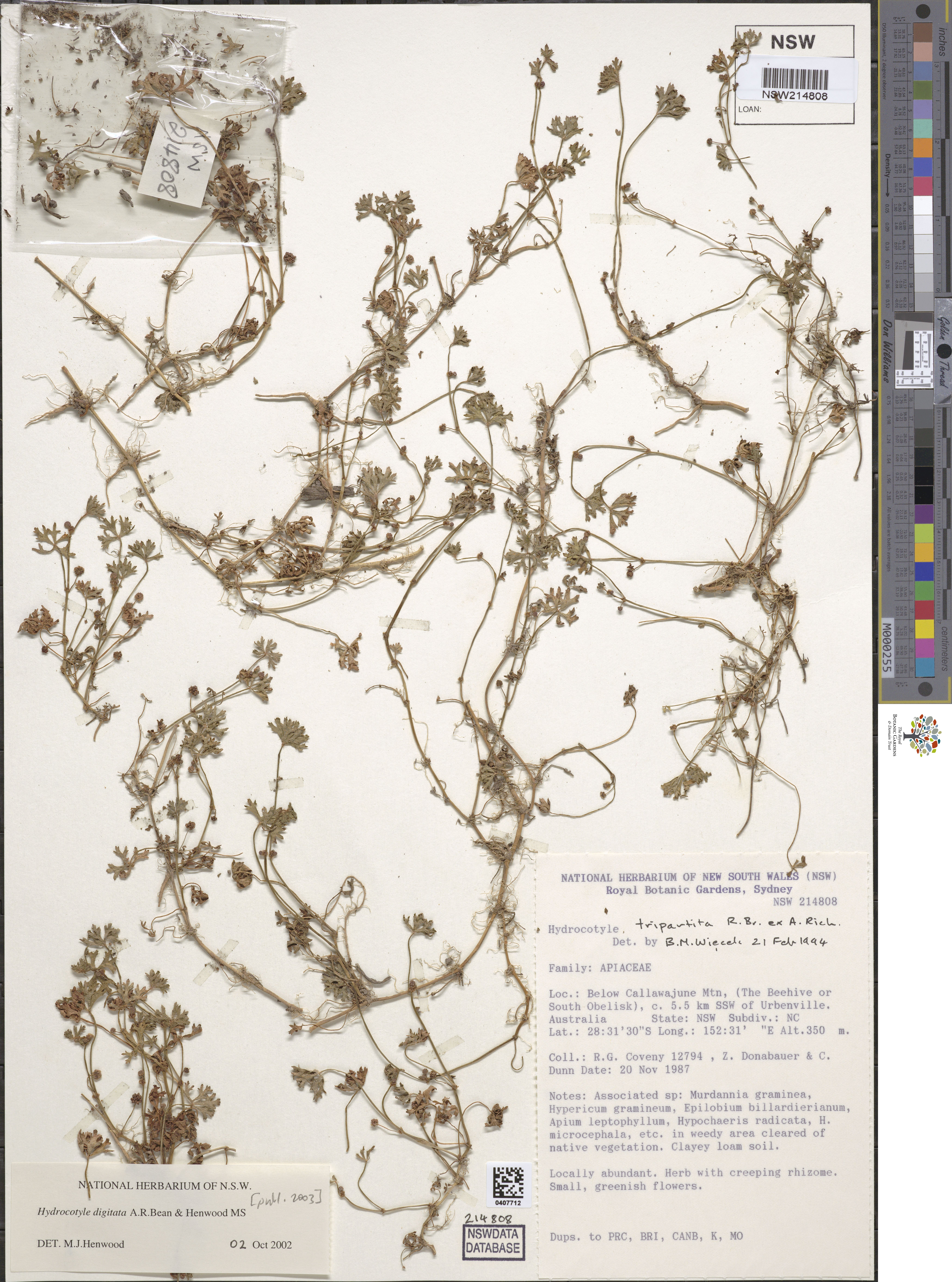
- Herbarium specimen

Conservation status
- Least Concern (NCA)

Scientific classification
- Kingdom: Plantae
- Clade: Tracheophytes
- Clade: Angiosperms
- Clade: Eudicots
- Clade: Asterids
- Order: Apiales
- Family: Araliaceae
- Genus: Hydrocotyle
- Species: H. digitata

Binomial name
- Hydrocotyle digitata A.R.Bean & Henwood

= Hydrocotyle digitata =

Species of flowering plant

Hydrocotyle digitata is a species of plant in the ivy family Araliaceae. It is native to parts of Queensland and New South Wales, Australia. It is a small perennial herb with a creeping habit, leaves are trifoliate and each leaflet has a number of lobes. The inflorescences have about 10–13 very small flowers in an umbel, the fruits are mericarps about 1 mm (0.04 in) long and wide.

== Distribution and habitat ==
It is found in two widely disjunct populations, one on the Atherton Tableland near Cairns, Queensland, and the other in a broad area from about Warwick in southeast Queensland, to near Armidale in northeast New South Wales. It grows in very wet ground among open eucalypt forest.
