= Jin Qian Cao =

Jin Qian Cao or Jinqiancao (金钱草, "Gold Coin Grass/Herb/Weed") is a term used in traditional Chinese herbal medicine. It can refer to several different herbal species, generally identified by their native regions. The most common of these in the Chinese trade, listed in the Pharmacopoeia of the People's Republic of China, is Lysimachia christinae, but in the West Desmodium and Glechoma may be more commonly encountered.

- Lysimachia christinae (Sichuan Da ("Large Sichuan") Jinqiancao, Guoluhuang)
- Dichondra repens (Sichuan Xiao ("Small Sichuan") Jinqiancao)
- Desmodium styracifolium (Guang Jinqiancao, Herba Desmodii Styracifolii)
- Hydrocotyle sibthorpioides (Jiangxi Jinqiancao)
- Glechoma hederacea (Jiangsu Jinqiancao)
- Lysimachia kunmingcensis (Kunming Jinqiancao)
