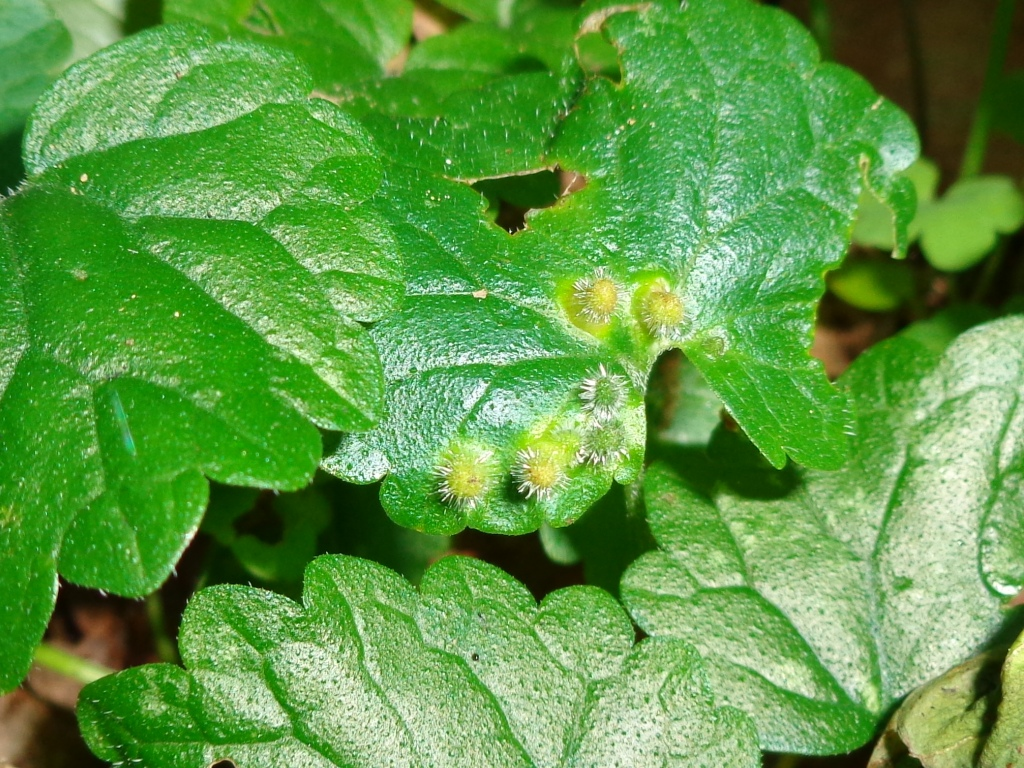
- Rondaniola bursaria gall on Glechoma hederacea

Scientific classification
- Kingdom: Animalia
- Phylum: Arthropoda
- Class: Insecta
- Order: Diptera
- Family: Cecidomyiidae
- Genus: Rondaniola
- Species: R. bursaria

Binomial name
- Rondaniola bursaria (Bremi, 1847)

= Rondaniola bursaria =

Species of fly

Rondaniola bursaria is a species of fly in the family Cecidomyiidae, found in the Palearctic The larvae gall ground ivy (Glechoma hederacea).
