= Hydrocotyle hexagona =

Conservation status
- Vulnerable (IUCN 3.1)

Scientific classification
- Kingdom: Plantae
- Clade: Tracheophytes
- Clade: Angiosperms
- Clade: Eudicots
- Clade: Asterids
- Order: Apiales
- Family: Araliaceae
- Genus: Hydrocotyle
- Species: H. hexagona

Binomial name
- Hydrocotyle hexagona Mathias

Species of flowering plant

Hydrocotyle hexagona is a species of flowering plant in the family Apiaceae. It is endemic to Ecuador. Its natural habitat is subtropical or tropical moist montane forests. It is threatened by habitat loss.
