= Hydrocotyle hitchcockii =

Conservation status
- Least Concern (IUCN 3.1)

Scientific classification
- Kingdom: Plantae
- Clade: Tracheophytes
- Clade: Angiosperms
- Clade: Eudicots
- Clade: Asterids
- Order: Apiales
- Family: Araliaceae
- Genus: Hydrocotyle
- Species: H. hitchcockii

Binomial name
- Hydrocotyle hitchcockii Rose ex Mathias

Species of flowering plant

Hydrocotyle hitchcockii is a species of flowering plant in the family Araliaceae. It is endemic to Ecuador. Its natural habitats are subtropical or tropical moist lowland forests and subtropical or tropical moist montane forests. It is threatened by habitat loss.
