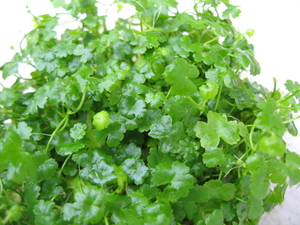

Scientific classification
- Kingdom: Plantae
- Clade: Tracheophytes
- Clade: Angiosperms
- Clade: Eudicots
- Clade: Asterids
- Order: Apiales
- Family: Araliaceae
- Genus: Hydrocotyle
- Species: H. tripartita

Binomial name
- Hydrocotyle tripartita R.Br. ex A.Rich.

= Hydrocotyle tripartita =

Species of flowering plant

Hydrocotyle tripartita is a perennial herb flowering with small white flowers that comes from New Zealand and the Australian states of Queensland, New South Wales and Victoria. It has small and vivid green creeping leaves on vertical stems.
