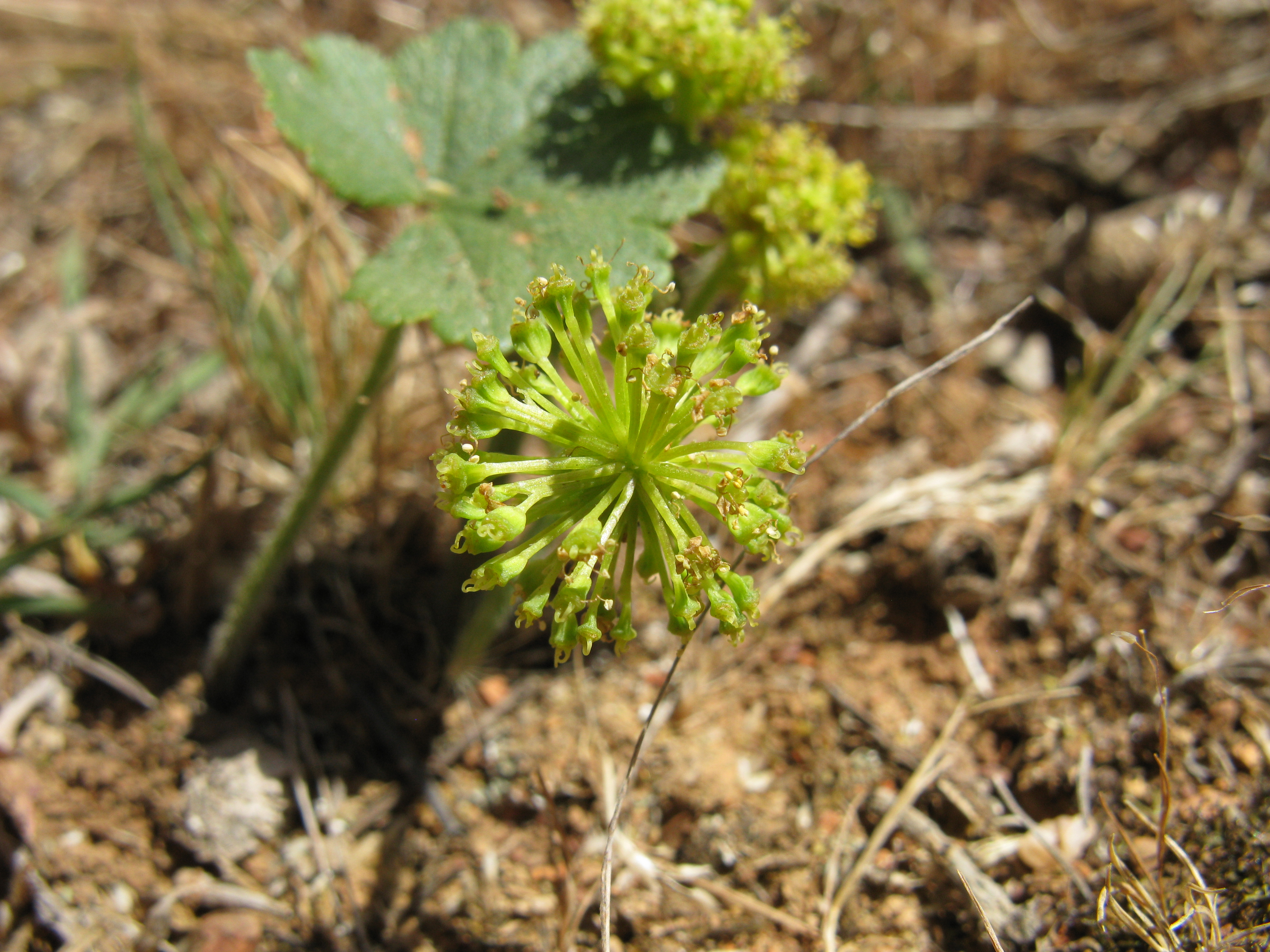

Scientific classification
- Kingdom: Plantae
- Clade: Embryophytes
- Clade: Tracheophytes
- Clade: Spermatophytes
- Clade: Angiosperms
- Clade: Eudicots
- Clade: Asterids
- Order: Apiales
- Family: Araliaceae
- Genus: Hydrocotyle
- Species: H. laxiflora

Binomial name
- Hydrocotyle laxiflora DC.

= Hydrocotyle laxiflora =

Stinking pennywort

Species of plant

Hydrocotyle laxiflora commonly known as stinking pennywort, is a species of plant in the family Araliaceae. It has hairy, lobed leaves and cream coloured flowers and is endemic to Australia.

== Description ==
Hydrocotyle laxiflora is a spreading, perennial herb with white or yellow rhizomes, sometimes up to 1 m (3 ft 3 in) long, branches densely covered with coarse, rough hairs, branches upright or ascending to about 15 cm (5.9 in) high. Leaves are borne singly along the rhizome, circular, kidney or heart-shaped, slightly lobed, hairy and 10–40 mm (0.39–1.57 in) in diameter on a petiole 1–12 cm (0.39–4.72 in) long. Flowers are in simple umbels, roughly spherical, 5–8 mm (0.20–0.31 in) in diameter, mostly 30-50 flowered emitting an offensive odour. Flowering occurs from October to December and the fruit is a ribbed mericarp, 1.5–2 mm (0.059–0.079 in) long and 1.8–2.5 mm (0.071–0.098 in) wide.

== Taxonomy and naming ==
Hydrocotyle laxiflora was first formally described in 1830 by Augustin Pyramus de Candolle and the description was published in Prodromus Systematis Naturalis Regni Vegetabilis.The specific epithet (laxiflora) means loose flower heads.

== Distribution and habitat ==
Stinking pennywort grows in shady, moist, loamy or humus rich soils in South Australia, Queensland, New South Wales, Australian Capital Territory, Victoria and Tasmania.
