= Hydrocotyle tambalomaensis =

Conservation status
- Near Threatened (IUCN 3.1)

Scientific classification
- Kingdom: Plantae
- Clade: Tracheophytes
- Clade: Angiosperms
- Clade: Eudicots
- Clade: Asterids
- Order: Apiales
- Family: Araliaceae
- Genus: Hydrocotyle
- Species: H. tambalomaensis

Binomial name
- Hydrocotyle tambalomaensis H. Wolff

Species of flowering plant

Hydrocotyle tambalomaensis is a species of flowering plant in the family Araliaceae. It is endemic to Ecuador. Its natural habitats are subtropical or tropical moist montane forests and subtropical or tropical high-altitude grassland. It is threatened by habitat loss.
