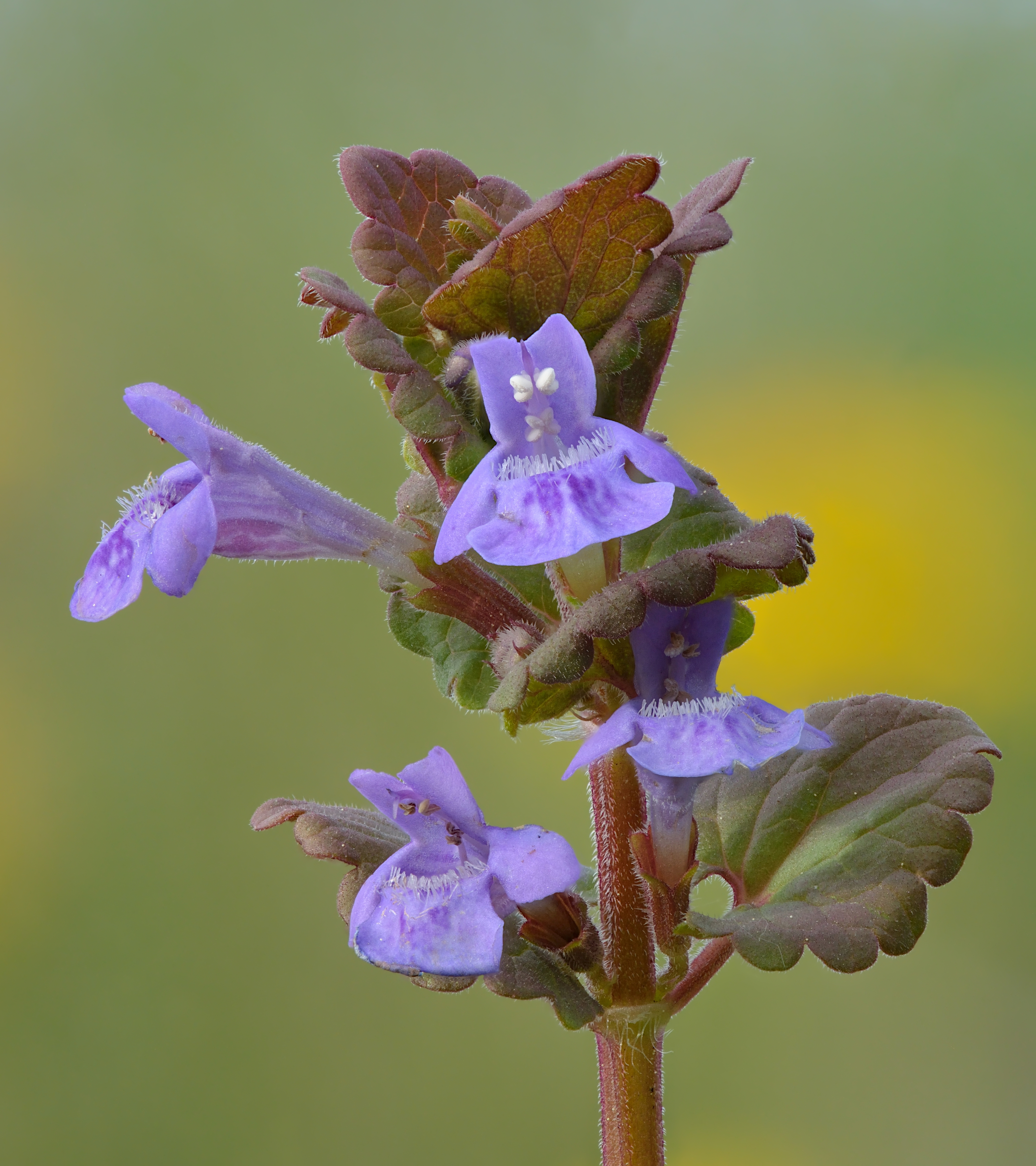

Scientific classification
- Kingdom: Plantae
- Clade: Tracheophytes
- Clade: Angiosperms
- Clade: Eudicots
- Clade: Asterids
- Order: Lamiales
- Family: Lamiaceae
- Genus: Glechoma
- Species: G. hederacea

Binomial name
- Glechoma hederacea L.

Synonyms
- List: Calamintha hederacea (L.) Scop.; Chamaecissos hederaceus (L.) Nieuwl. & Lunell; Chamaeclema hederacea (L.) Moench; Glechoma borealis Salisb.; Glechonion hederaceum (L.) St.-Lag.; Nepeta glechoma Benth.; Nepeta hederacea (L.) Trevis.

= Glechoma hederacea =

Species of plant in the mint family

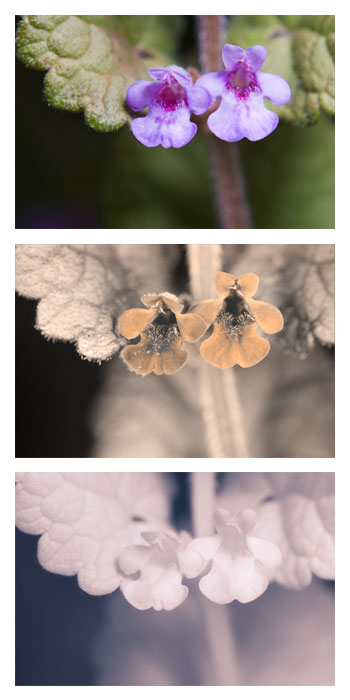
Flower's appearance in visible, UVA, and NIR spectrums. The UV nectar guides may help attract bees.

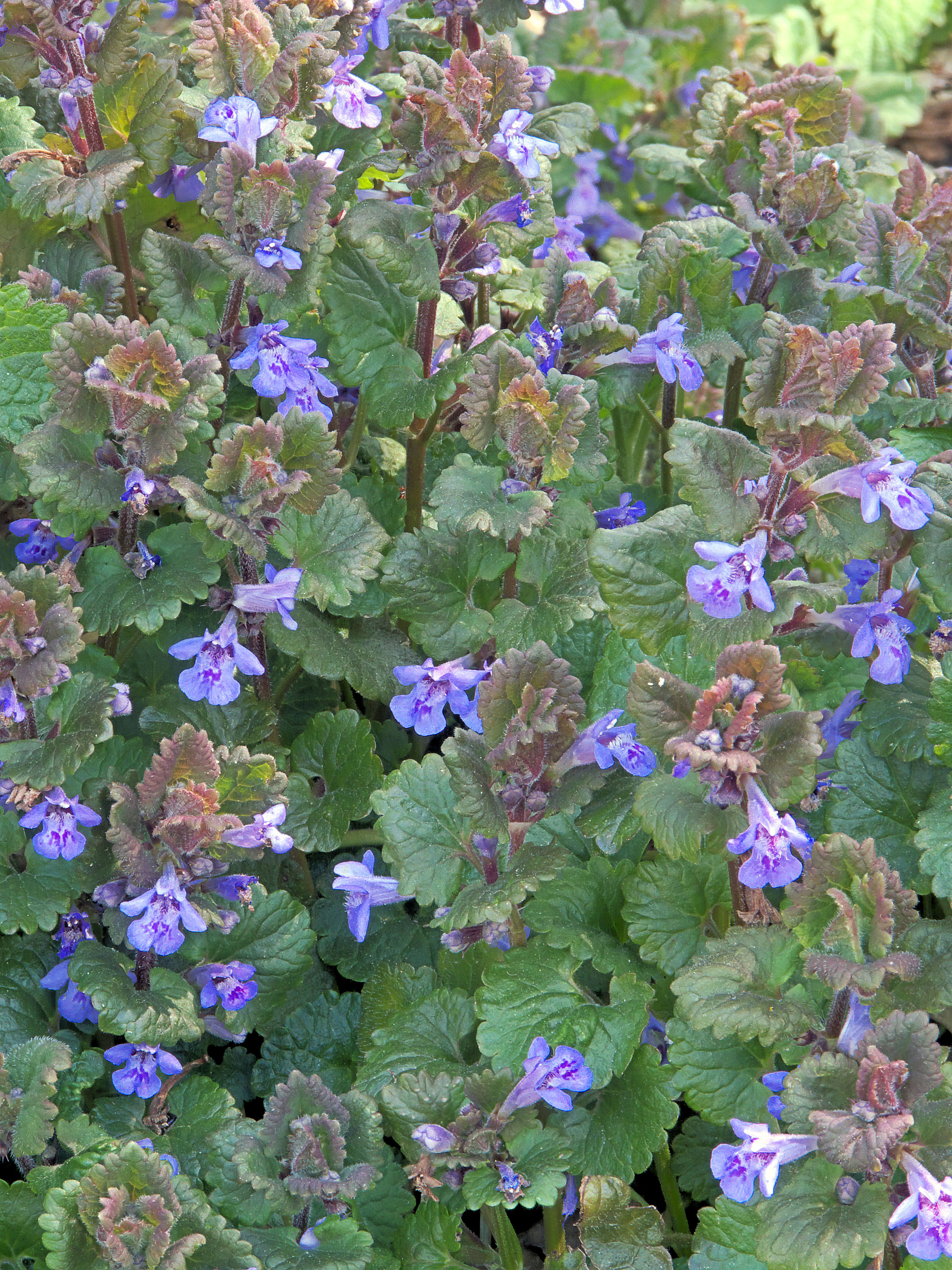

Glechoma hederacea is an aromatic, perennial, evergreen creeper of the mint family Lamiaceae. It is commonly known as ground-ivy, gill-over-the-ground, creeping charlie, alehoof, tunhoof, catsfoot, field balm, and run-away-robin. It is also sometimes known as creeping jenny, but that name more commonly refers to Lysimachia nummularia. It is used as a salad green in many countries.

European settlers carried it around the world, and it has become a well-established introduced and naturalized plant in a wide variety of localities. It is also considered an aggressive invasive weed of woodlands and lawns in some parts of North America. In the absence of any biological control research conducted by the United States Department of Agriculture, herbicides are relied upon (despite their drawbacks) particularly for woodland ecosystems. The plant's extensive root system makes it difficult to eradicate by hand-pulling.

== Description ==
Glechoma hederacea can be identified by its round to reniform (kidney- or fan-shaped), crenate (with round-toothed edges) opposed leaves 2–3 cm (3/4–1 1/4 in) diameter, on 3–6 cm (1 1/4–2 1/4 in) long petioles attached to square stems that root at the nodes. The plant spreads either by stolon or seed, making it exceptionally difficult to eradicate. It is a variable species, its size being influenced by environmental conditions, from 5–50 cm (2–19 1/2 in) tall. It is creeping in habit, with its stems growing a long as 1 m in length. As a seedling, G. hederacea has glabrous kidney-shaped cotyledons with a small notch at the tip.

The flowers of G. hederacea are bilaterally symmetrical, funnel shaped, blue or bluish-violet to lavender, and grow in opposed clusters of two or three flowers in the leaf axils on the upper part of the stem or near the tip. It usually flowers in the spring. The fruits are dry and indehiscent with small, dark brown, flat dry nuts 1.0 to 2.0 mm in length and 1.0 mm wide.

=== Reproduction ===
Glechoma hederecea is gynodioecious, with genets being either female or hermaphrodite. The females depend upon pollen from hermaphrodites for pollination. Female flowers tend to be smaller than hermaphrodite flowers. Disagreement exists among biologists as to whether hermaphrodite flowers can pollinate themselves. The plant spends the winter as either a small ramet or a small rosette. It produces flowers between April and July, which are visited by many types of insects, and can be characterized by a generalized pollination syndrome. Each pollinated flower can produce up to four seeds, which are dispersed by the stem bending over and depositing the ripe seeds in the ground adjacent to the parent plant, although ants may carry the seeds further. The seeds germinate a few days after contact with moisture, although they can be stored dry. Dry storage for a period up to a month is thought to improve the germination rate.

The plant can also reproduce clonally, with the stems bending down to the earth and allowing roots to attach themselves. Single clones can grow several metres across, although precise data are not available.

=== Similar species ===
G. hederacea is sometimes confused with common mallow (Malva neglecta), which also has round, lobed leaves, but mallow leaves are attached to the stem at the back of a rounded leaf, where ground ivy has square stems and leaves, which are attached in the center of the leaf, more prominent rounded lobes on their edges, attach to the stems in an opposite arrangement, and have a hairy upper surface. In addition, mallow and other creeping plants sometimes confused with ground ivy do not spread from nodes on stems. In addition, ground ivy emits a distinctive odor when damaged, being a member of the mint family.

== Distribution and habitat ==
European settlers carried it around the world, and it has become a well-established introduced and naturalized plant in a wide variety of localities. It is also considered an aggressive invasive weed of woodlands and lawns in some parts of North America, being considered a non-native plant in the United States, and invasive in some U.S. states. It has invaded wild areas, sometimes choking out native wildflowers.

G. hederacea thrives in moist shaded areas, but also tolerates sun very well. It is a common plant in grasslands and wooded areas or wasteland. It also thrives in lawns and around buildings, since it survives mowing. Part of the reason for its wide distribution is its rhizomatous method of reproduction.

== Ecology ==
A number of wild bees collect pollen from this plant, including Anthophora furcata, Anthidum manicatum, Anthophora plumipes, Anthophora quadrimaculata, Osmia aurulenta, Osmia caerulentes, and Osmia uncinata. The plant is also galled by several insects, including Rondaniola bursaria (lighthouse gall), Liposthenes glechomae or Liposthenes latreillei (Kieffer, 1898) (a gall wasp).

It forms dense mats that can take over areas of lawn and woodlands, thus is considered an invasive or aggressive weed in suitable climates where it is not native.

=== Control ===
A non-native invasive in North America, Glechoma is familiar to a large number of people as a weed, a property it shares with many others of the mint family. It can be a problem in heavy, rich soils with good fertility, high moisture, and low boron content. It thrives particularly well in shady areas where grass does not grow well, such as woodlands, although it can also be a problem in full sun.

Because the plant is stoloniferous and continues to spread from its roots or bits of stem which reroot, even small infestations resist repeated hand weeding. Like crabgrass, G. hederacea's root has a tough-to-remove ball (unbelied by its delicate wide leaves).

No biological control agents are known to help to reduce its spread in North America. Commercial herbicides containing triclopyr are used to control the plant.

G. hederacea is also unusually sensitive to boron, and can be killed by applying borax (sodium tetraborate) in solution. However, borax is toxic to ants and to animals at only slightly higher concentrations, and does not break down in the environment. In addition to adverse long-term effects on soil or groundwater, recent research discounts the very efficacy of borax treatment, primarily because finding the correct concentration for a given area is difficult and the potential for damaging desired plants is high.

== Safety ==
Although it has been used by humans as a salad green and in herbal medicines for thousands of years, the species is also believed to be toxic to livestock, particularly horses. Wild pigs, however, are reported to feed on it. Some accounts report it is toxic to rodents, while bank voles in Great Britain have been observed to use it as a food source. Like other members of the Lamiaceae, G. hederacea contains bioactive volatile oils, including terpenoids and pulegone; these are responsible for the characteristic "minty" odor and taste of plants in the mint family. Their activity in humans varies depending on many factors, including concentration, quantity of intake, and whether administration is internal or external. Lamiacaeae plants with very high volatile oil concentrations, such as European pennyroyal (Mentha pulegium), have traditional uses as disinfectants, flea-killers, and abortifacients, and are hepatotoxic to humans. Other members of the Lamiacaeae, such as Mentha spicata, spearmint, are widely and safely used in teas and flavorings for their volatile oils. The concentration of volatile oil in G. hederacea is less than 1/30th that in European pennyroyal. The effects of Glechoma on humans have been little studied.

== Uses ==
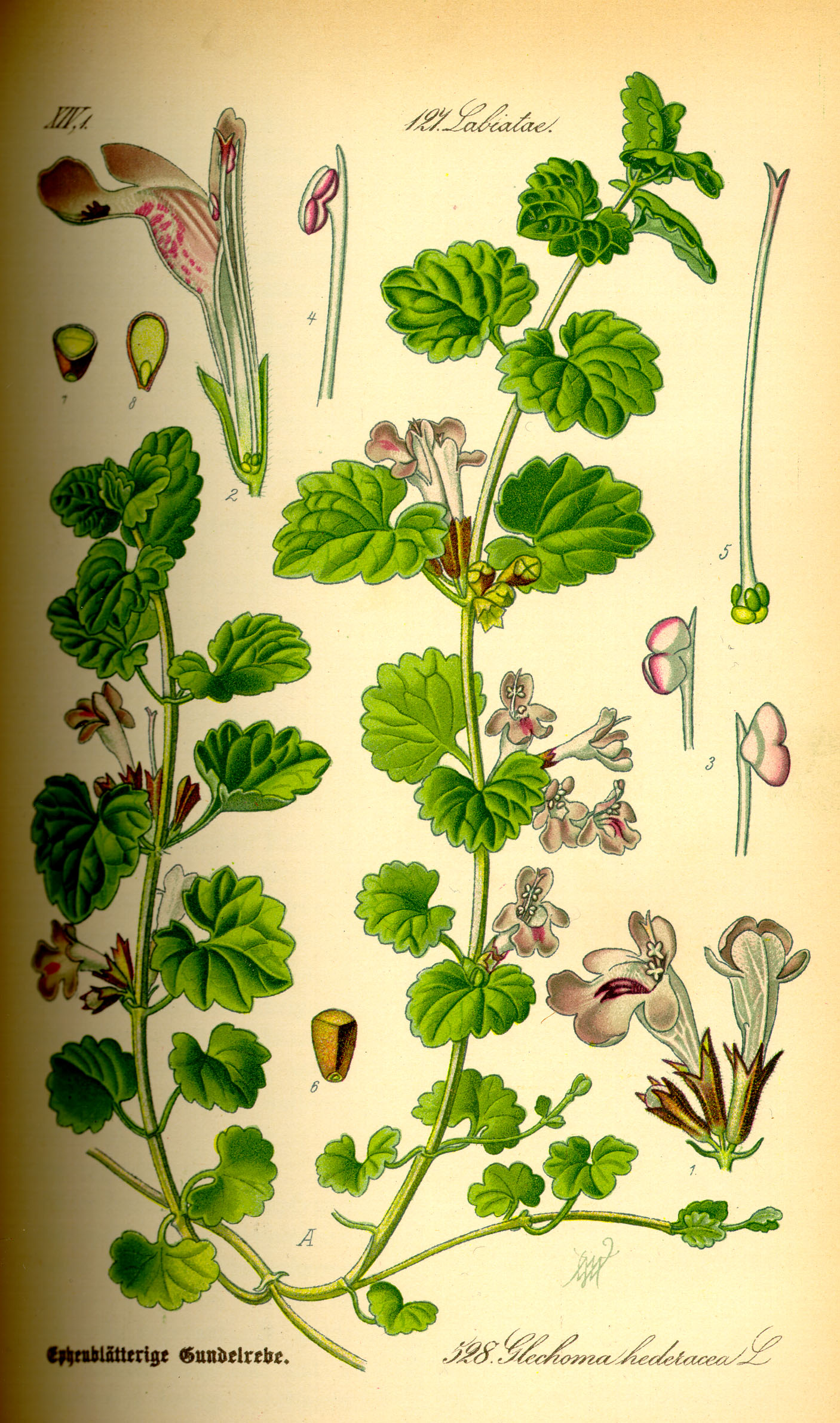
Botanical illustration

It is grown as a garden plant in pots and occasionally as a groundcover. Easily cultivated, it grows well in shaded places. A variegated variety is commercially available; in many areas, this is the dominant form, which has escaped cultivation and become established as an aggressive, adventitious groundcover.

The pre-bloom leaves can be cooked as a vegetable or made into tea.

G. hederacea was also widely used by the Saxons in brewing ale as flavoring, clarification, and preservative, and later by the English, before the introduction of hops into brewing in the late 15th century. From this, the brewing-related names arose for the herb, e.g. alehoof, tunhoof, and gill-over-the-ground. In the 18th century, beer brewed with ground ivy was known as gill ale and was said to have medicinal properties. It was made by infusing the herb in strong ale and was sold at coffee and victualling houses.

Enzymes similar to chymosin in G. hederacea have been used in the cheese-making process as a substitute for animal rennet.

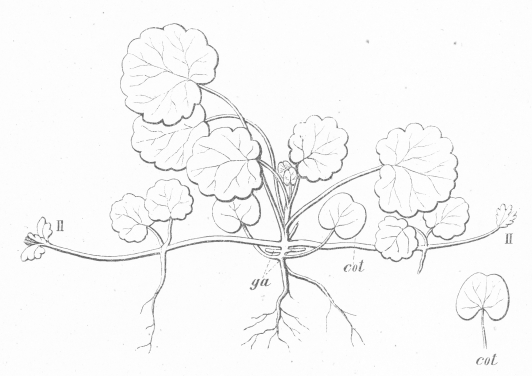
G. hederacea seedling - cot = cotyledons; ga = axillary bud, from (Warming 1884)

=== Traditional medicine ===
G. hederacea has been used in the traditional medicine of Europe going back thousands of years; Galen recommends the plant to treat inflammation of the eyes. John Gerard, an English herbalist, recommended it to treat tinnitus, and as a "diuretic, astringent, tonic, and gentle stimulant. Useful in kidney diseases and for indigestion." It has also been used as a "lung herb". Its presence as an invasive weed in North America is the result of the value placed on it by European settlers as a medicinal herb and ale preservative; the species was imported and widely cultivated in herb and kitchen gardens. Its other traditional uses include as an expectorant or astringent, and to treat bronchitis. In traditional Austrian medicine, the herb has been prescribed for internal application as salad or tea for the treatment of a variety of different conditions, including disorders associated with the liver and bile, gastrointestinal tract, respiratory tract, kidneys and urinary tract, fever, and influenza. In traditional Chinese medicine, it is known as Jiangsu Jinqiancao (江苏金钱草）.
