= Hydrocotyle javanica =

Scientific classification
- Kingdom: Plantae
- Clade: Embryophytes
- Clade: Tracheophytes
- Clade: Spermatophytes
- Clade: Angiosperms
- Clade: Eudicots
- Clade: Asterids
- Order: Apiales
- Family: Araliaceae
- Genus: Hydrocotyle
- Species: H. javanica

Binomial name
- Hydrocotyle javanica Thunb.

Species of flowering plant

Hydrocotyle javanica, commonly known as Java pennywort, is a species of Hydrocotyle. It is a prostrate herb found in NE India and SE Asia. Leaves are simple, circular-heart-shaped, with seven triangular shallow lobes. Leaves are 2.5-5 x 3–5.5 cm in size, and the margin has rounded teeth. Java pennywort is closely related to Indian pennywort. Tiny white flowers arise in 20 flowered umbels. Java pennywort is seen in shady, moist places at altitudes greater than 1300 m. Flowers have five greenish-white petals and five stamens. Fruit is broadly ovoid, 1 mm, laterally compressed. In Manipur, the leaves are eaten as a substitute for Indian pennywort. Flowering: June–July.
