= Hydrocotyle hirta =

Conservation status
- Least Concern (IUCN 3.1)

Scientific classification
- Kingdom: Plantae
- Clade: Tracheophytes
- Clade: Angiosperms
- Clade: Eudicots
- Clade: Asterids
- Order: Apiales
- Family: Araliaceae
- Genus: Hydrocotyle
- Species: H. hirta

Binomial name
- Hydrocotyle hirta A.Rich. ex R.Br.

Species of plant

Hydrocotyle hirta, commonly known as the hairy pennywort, is a species of flowering plant in the family Araliaceae native to Australia.
