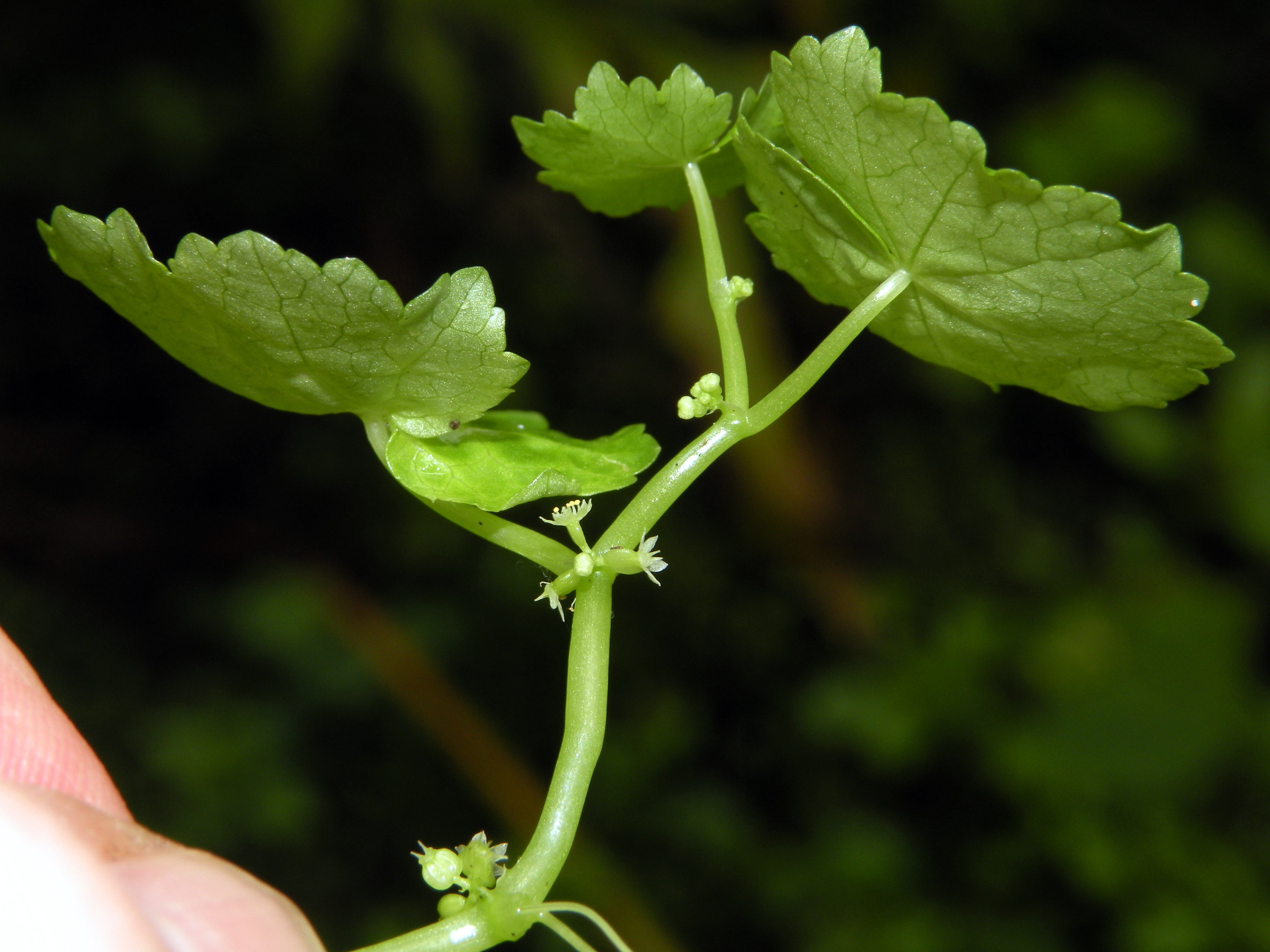

Scientific classification
- Kingdom: Plantae
- Clade: Tracheophytes
- Clade: Angiosperms
- Clade: Eudicots
- Clade: Asterids
- Order: Apiales
- Family: Araliaceae
- Genus: Hydrocotyle
- Species: H. americana

Binomial name
- Hydrocotyle americana L.
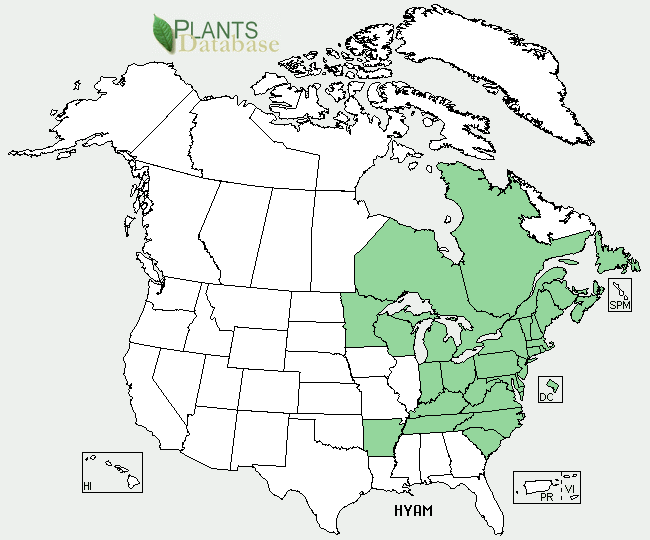

= Hydrocotyle americana =

American marshpennywort

Species of flowering plant

Hydrocotyle americana is a small plant native to the Northeastern United States. It is commonly referred to as American marshpennywort or navelwort and American water-pennywort. H. americana grows from Ontario to Newfoundland south through the Appalachian Mountains to South Carolina. H. americana has been introduced to South Africa as well as New Zealand.

== Habitat ==
American marshpennywort typically grows in moist areas such as bogs, seeps, boggy fields, wet woods, and lake margins. It is widespread in the northern part of its range, becoming less common further south and limited to more specific habitats. For example, in South Carolina, at the southern end of H. americana's range, it is found only on "Spray Cliff" communities where mist and water from a nearby waterfall keeps the plants hydrated.

== Description ==
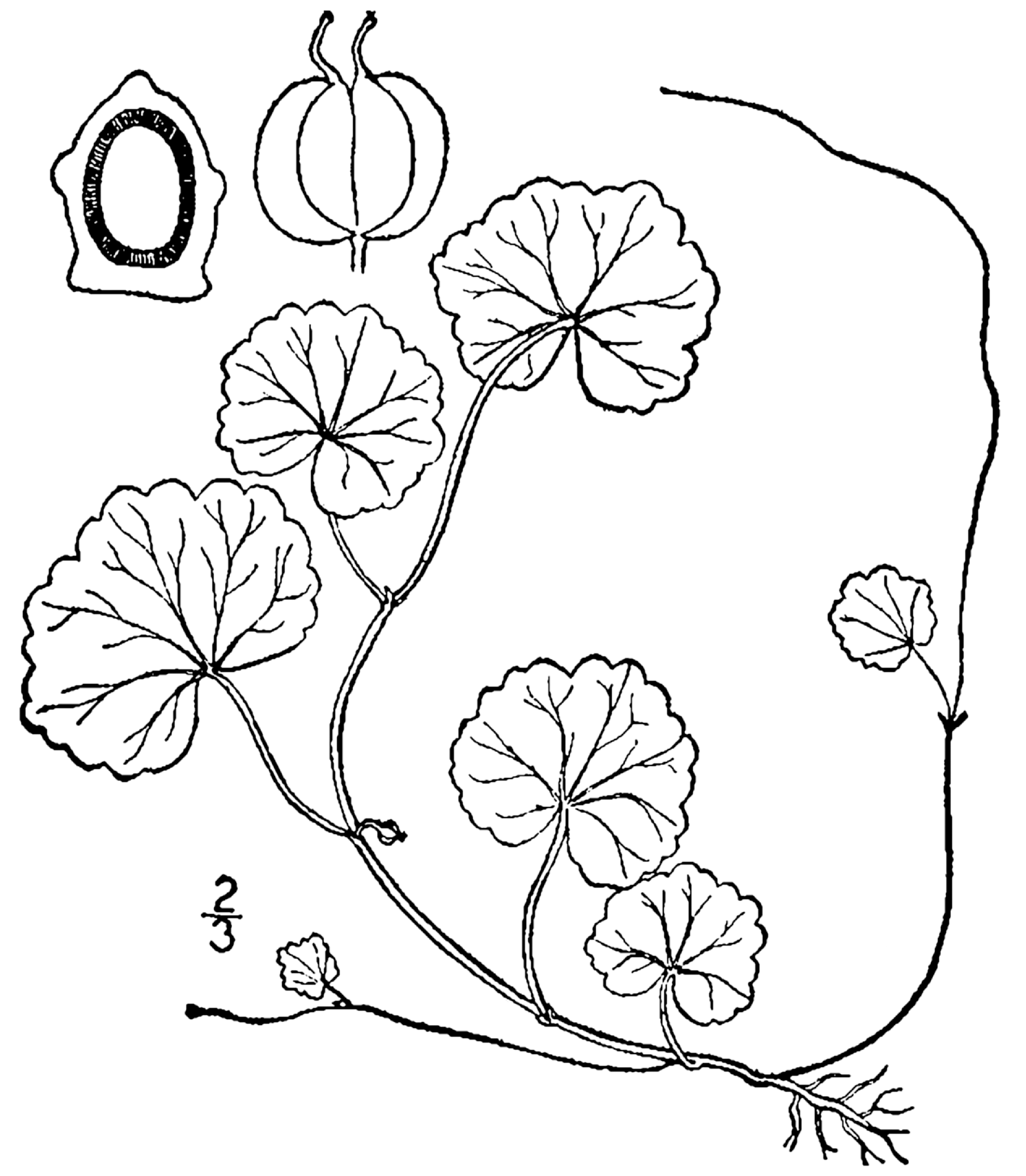
Illustration of H. americana

Hydrocotyle americana is a small perennial herb which sprawls along the ground with the aid of stolons which root as the plant crawls along the ground. It produces small tubers along the stem which aid in reproduction; these tubers are typically less than 1 cm long and cylindrical, but tubers up to 1.5 cm have been observed. The plant can also create runners which spread along the ground and are longer than the stolons. The leaves art 2–5 cm wide, and shallowly lobed. Flowers and fruits are inconspicuous and often hidden below the leaves. As with all plants in the Araliaceae the flower form is an umbel composed of 2-7 flowers located in the leaf axils.
