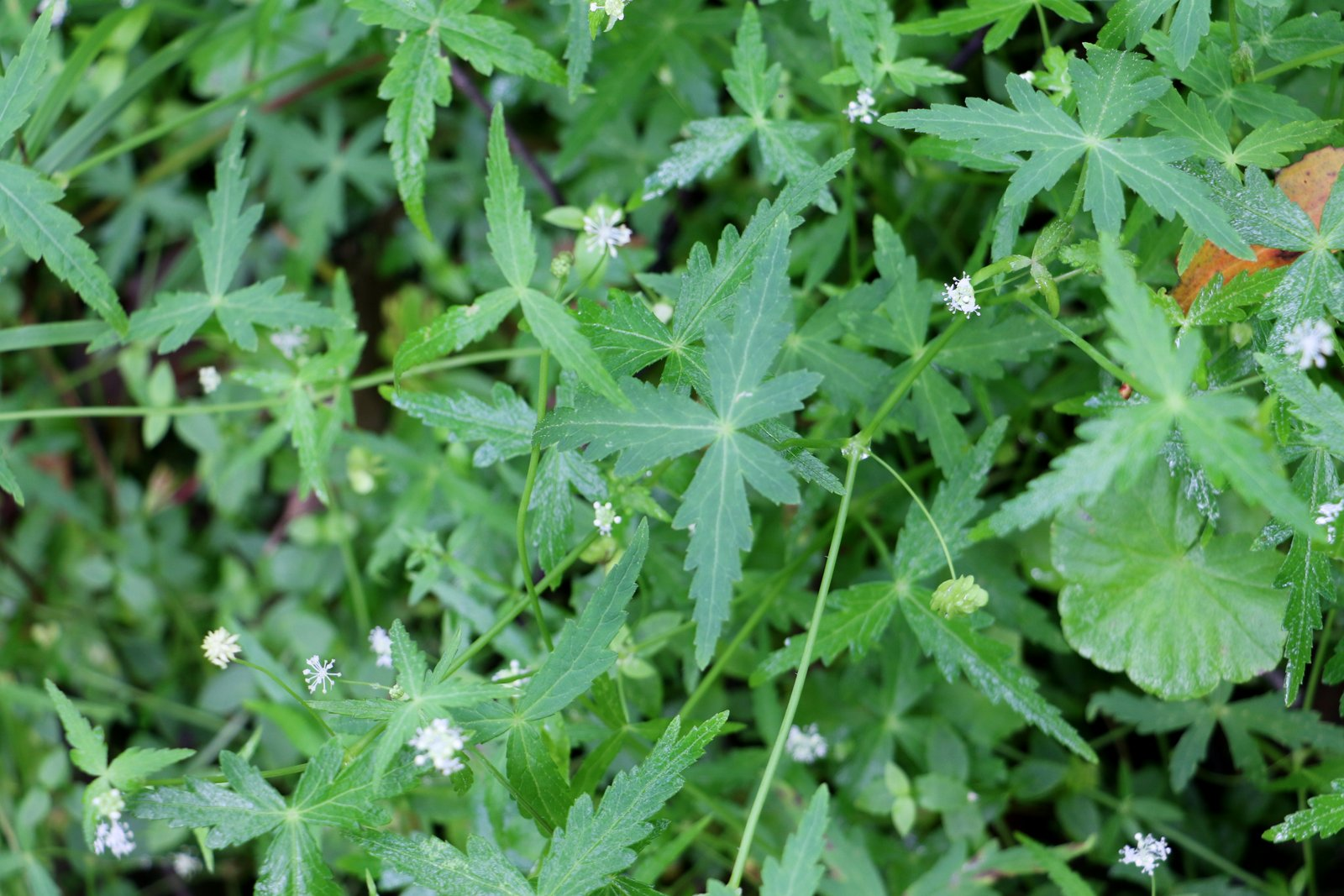
- At Monga National Park, Australia

Scientific classification
- Kingdom: Plantae
- Clade: Tracheophytes
- Clade: Angiosperms
- Clade: Eudicots
- Clade: Asterids
- Order: Apiales
- Family: Araliaceae
- Genus: Hydrocotyle
- Species: H. geraniifolia

Binomial name
- Hydrocotyle geraniifolia F.Muell.

= Hydrocotyle geraniifolia =

Forest pennywort

Species of flowering plant

Hydrocotyle geraniifolia, commonly known as the forest pennywort, is a species of Hydrocotyle found in Australia. The habitat is moist forest floors often on the sides of hills.
