= Ludmila Kupriyanova =

Russian botanist

Ludmila Andreyevna Kupriyanova (1914–1987) (Russian: Людмила Андреевна Куприянова) was a Soviet palynologist and Chairman of the Palynological Section of the All-Union Botanical Society (USSR). Her scientific career spanned more than 50 years, most of it associated with the Komarov Botanical Institute in Leningrad. She was among the first to recognize the importance of vouchered pollen and spore reference collections for research.
