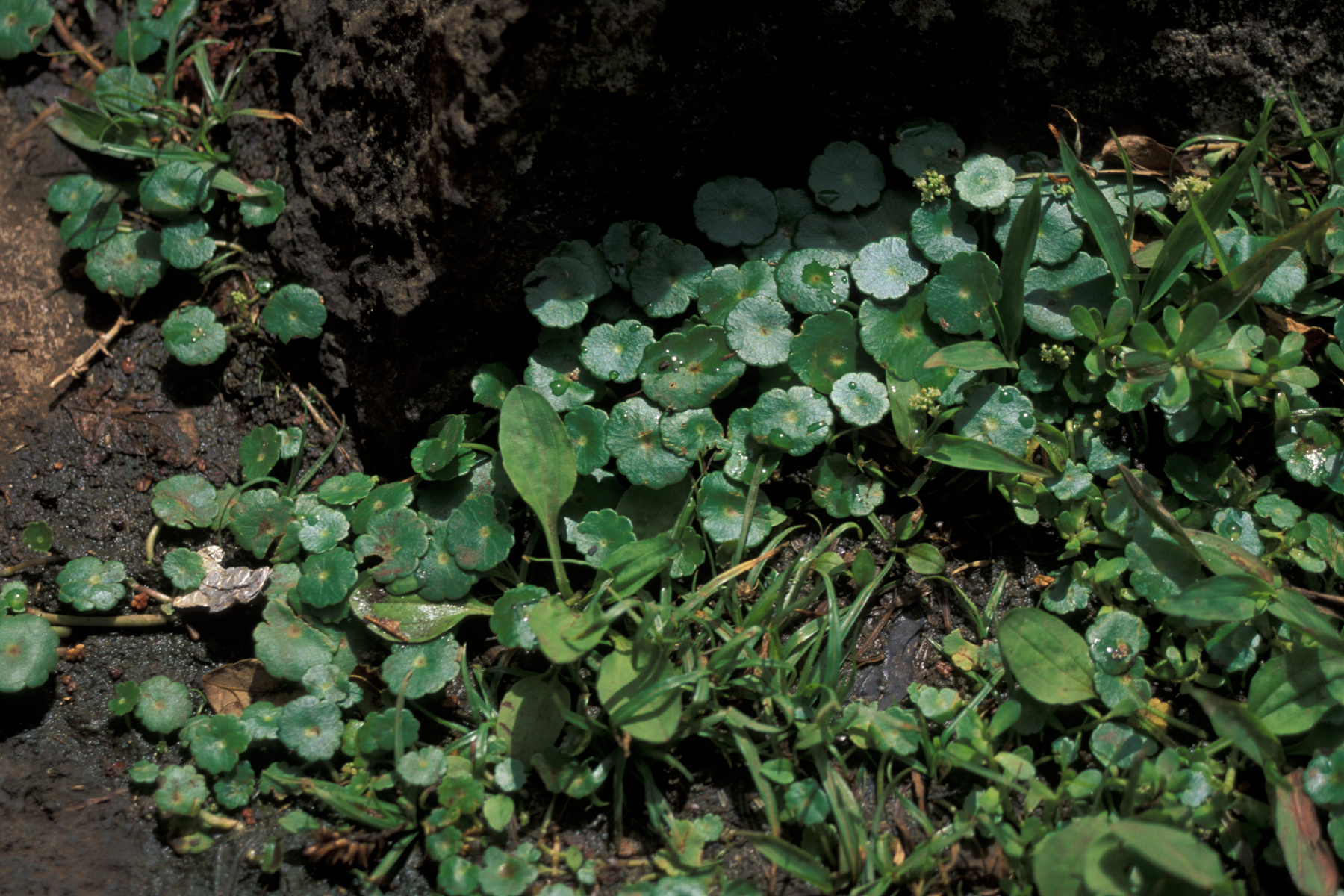

Conservation status
- Least Concern (IUCN 3.1)

Scientific classification
- Kingdom: Plantae
- Clade: Tracheophytes
- Clade: Angiosperms
- Clade: Eudicots
- Clade: Asterids
- Order: Apiales
- Family: Araliaceae
- Genus: Hydrocotyle
- Species: H. verticillata

Binomial name
- Hydrocotyle verticillata Thunb.

= Hydrocotyle verticillata =

Species of aquatic plant

Hydrocotyle verticillata, also known as whorled pennywort, whorled marshpennywort or shield pennywort, is a flowering plant found in South and North America and the West Indies. Its creeping habit and unusual leaves give it its common names. It grows in places that are marshy, boggy, or even wet.
Hydrocotyle verticillata is used in aquaria, where it is undemanding; it does prefer a good substrate, however, and at least moderate light. It benefits from additional carbon dioxide. It is widely used as a foreground plant.
