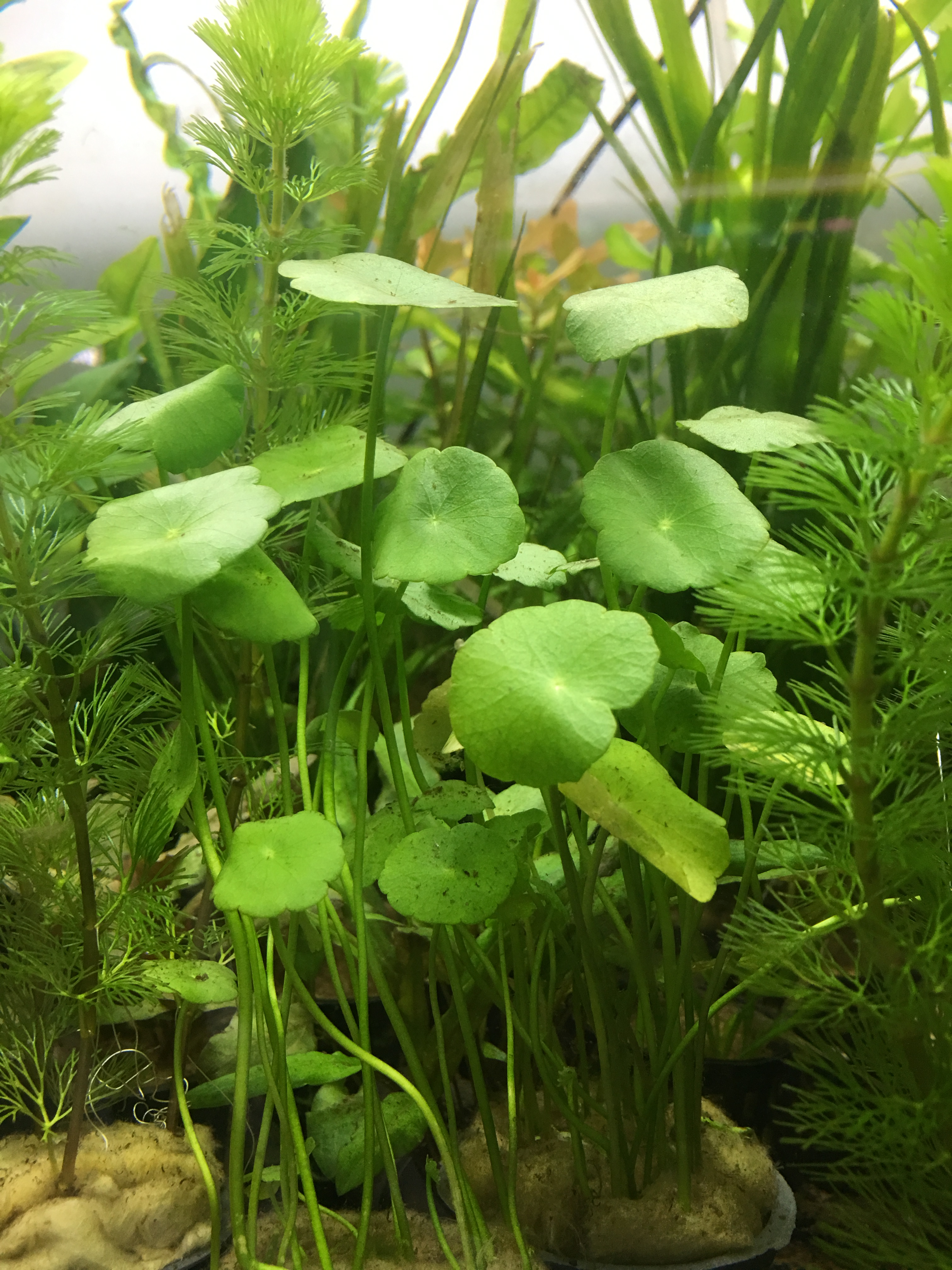
- Dollarweed in an aquatic plant shop

Conservation status
- Least Concern (IUCN 3.1)

Scientific classification
- Kingdom: Plantae
- Clade: Tracheophytes
- Clade: Angiosperms
- Clade: Eudicots
- Clade: Asterids
- Order: Apiales
- Family: Araliaceae
- Genus: Hydrocotyle
- Species: H. umbellata

Binomial name
- Hydrocotyle umbellata L.

= Hydrocotyle umbellata =

Species of aquatic plant

Hydrocotyle umbellata is an aquatic plant that thrives in wet, sandy habitat. It is known by several common names, including manyflower marshpennywort, dollarweed, water pennywort (in Canada), and as acariçoba (in Brazil). It is native to North America and parts of South America. At the north of its range, in Canada, the species is only known from three lakes located in southwestern Nova Scotia. Most of the Canadian population is found within Kejimkujik National Park. In Brazil, acariçoba has applications in herbal medicine with purported anxiolytic, analgesic and anti-inflammatory properties. It can also be found growing as an introduced species and sometimes a noxious weed on other continents. It is an edible weed that can be used in salads or as a pot herb. In some parts of its native American range, manyflower marshpennywort is considered to be a species at risk (including in Connecticut and Ohio), as well as in Canada, where water pennywort is listed as threatened federally (under COSEWIC) and as endangered in Nova Scotia.

== Description ==
They are aquatic or underwater herbs, floating or creeping, slightly succulent. The leaves are peltate, orbicular, 0.5–7.5 cm in diameter, crenate or slightly 8–20-lobed; petiole thin, 0.5–40 cm long. Inflorescences in the form of simple umbels with 10–60 flowers or a few peduncles proliferating and embracing whorls of slender-pedicellate flowers, peduncles usually slightly longer than the leaves. Ellipsoid fruit, 1–3 mm in diameter, with obvious and obtuse ribs.
