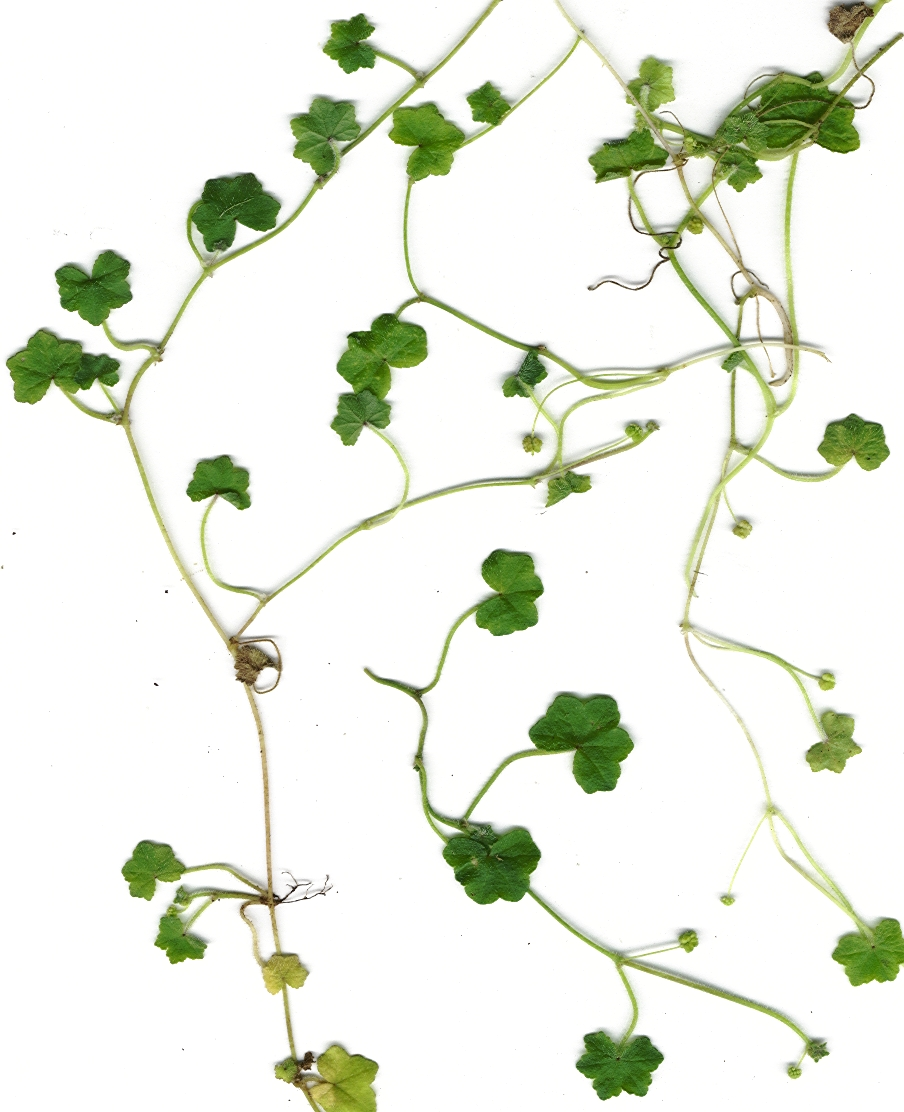
- Hydrocotyle bowlesioides

Scientific classification
- Kingdom: Plantae
- Clade: Tracheophytes
- Clade: Angiosperms
- Clade: Eudicots
- Clade: Asterids
- Order: Apiales
- Family: Araliaceae
- Subfamily: Hydrocotyloideae
- Genus: Hydrocotyle; L.

Synonyms
- Catepha Lesch. ex Rchb.; Chondrocarpus Nutt.; Glyceria Nutt.; Hidrocotile Neck., orth. var.; Neosciadium Domin

= Hydrocotyle =

Genus of aquatic plants

Hydrocotyle, also called floating pennywort, water pennywort, dollar weed, marsh penny, thick-leaved pennywort and white rot, is a genus of prostrate, perennial aquatic or semi-aquatic plants formerly classified in the family Apiaceae, now in the family Araliaceae.

== Description ==
Water pennyworts, Hydrocotyles, are very common. They have long creeping stems that often form dense mats, often in and near ponds, lakes, rivers, and marshes, and some species in coastal areas by the sea.

Leaves
Simple, with small leafy outgrowth at the base, kidney shaped to round. Leaf edges are scalloped. The leaf surfaces of Hydrocotyle are prime grounds for oviposition of many butterfly species, such as Anartia fatima.
Flowers
Flower clusters are simple and flat-topped or rounded. Involucral bracts at the base of each flower. Indistinct sepals.
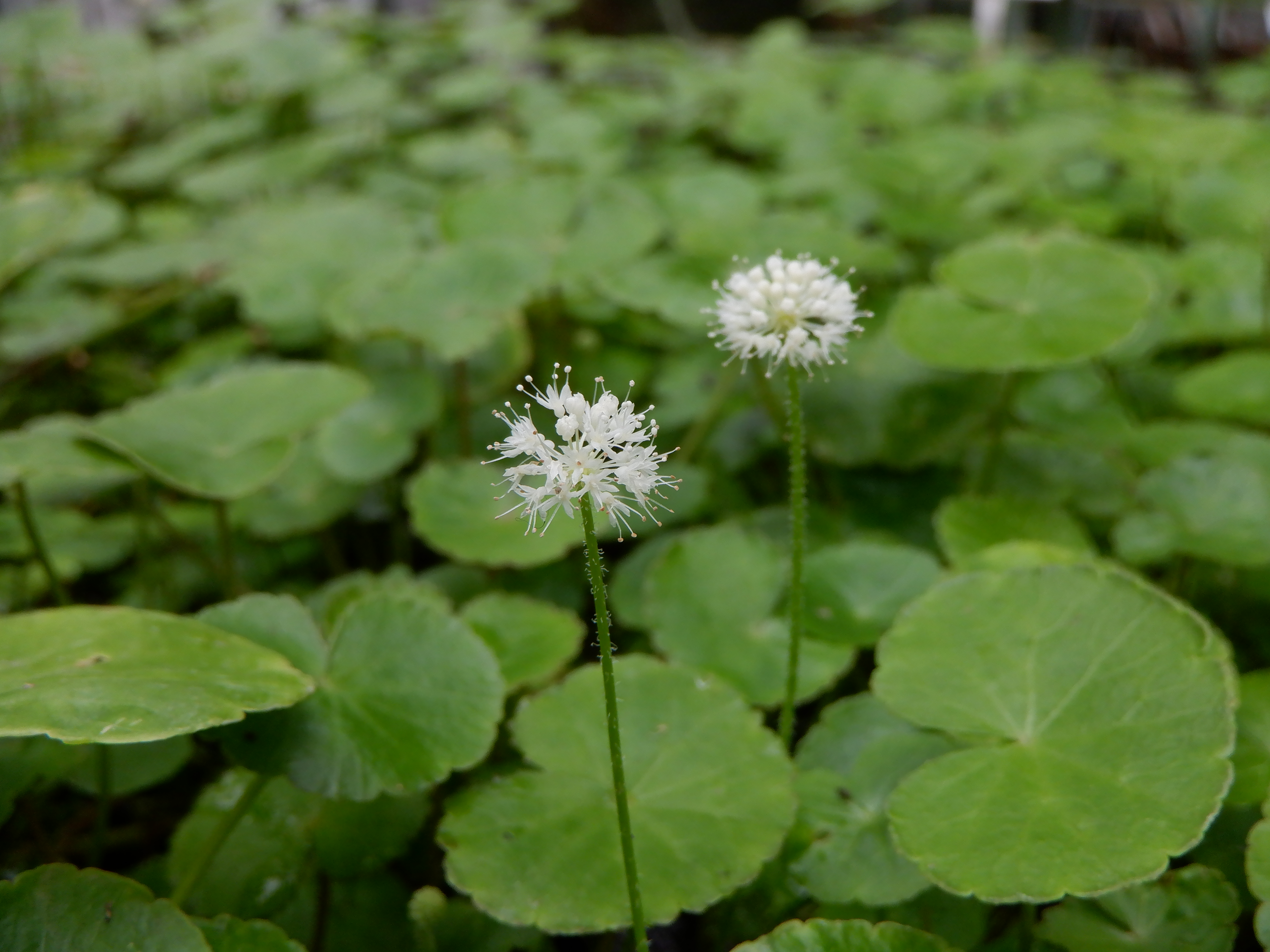
Flowering Hydrocotyle leucocephala

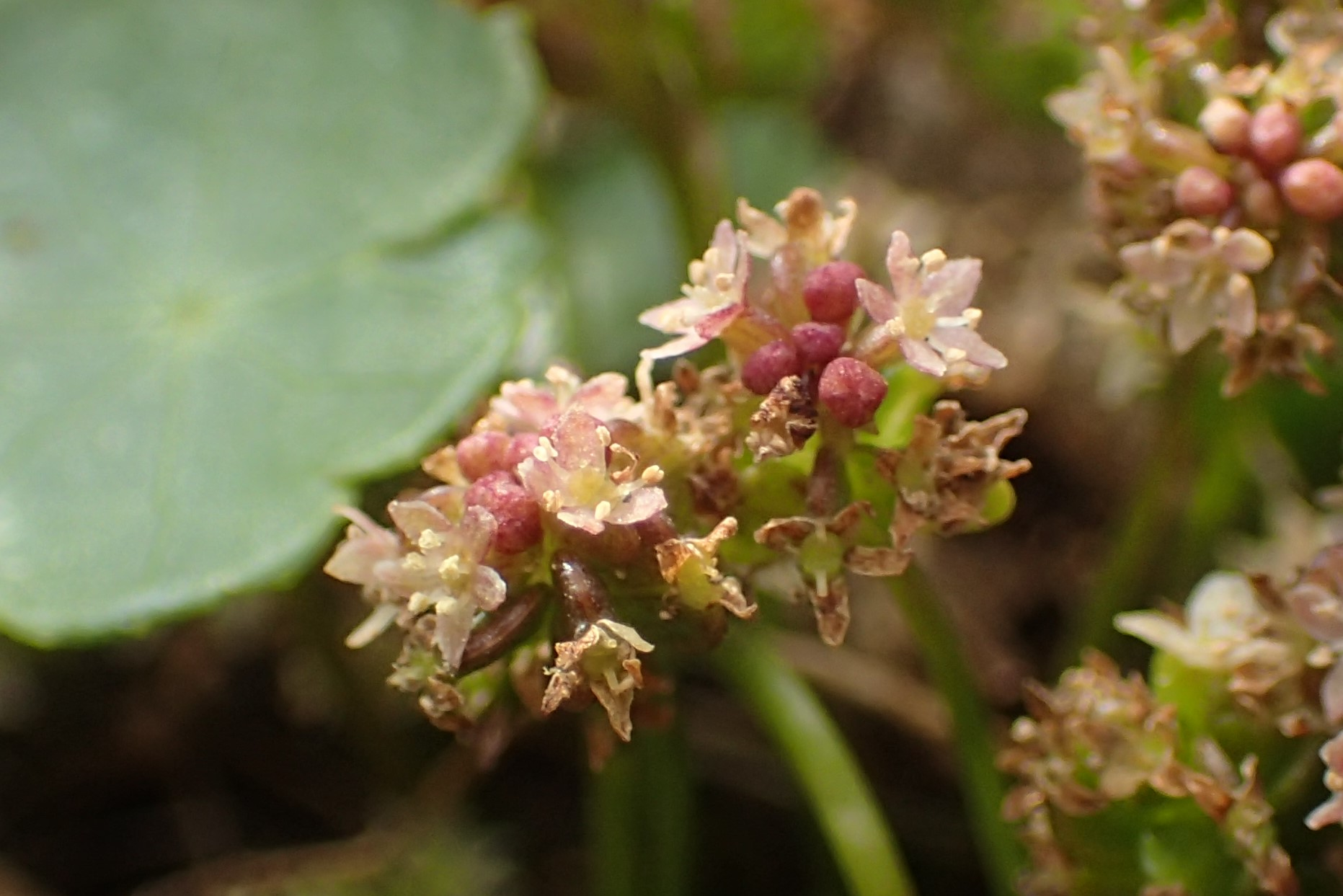
Flowering Hydrocotyle vulgaris
Fruits and reproduction
Elliptical to round with thin ridges and no oil tubes (vitta) which is characteristic in the fruit of umbelliferous plants.
The prostrate plants reproduce by seed and by sending roots from stem nodes.

== Selected species ==
There are over 280 species recognised in the genus Hydrocotyle that grow in tropical and temperate regions worldwide. A few species have entered the world of cultivated ornamental aquatics. A list of selected species:

- Hydrocotyle americana — American marshpennywort
- Hydrocotyle bonariensis — largeleaf pennywort
- Hydrocotyle bowlesioides — largeleaf marshpennywort
- Hydrocotyle heteromeria — waxweed
- Hydrocotyle geraniifolia
- Hydrocotyle hexagona
- Hydrocotyle hirta
- Hydrocotyle hitchcockii
- Hydrocotyle javanica
- Hydrocotyle laxiflora
- Hydrocotyle leucocephala — Brazilian pennywort
- Hydrocotyle moschata — musky marshpennywort
- Hydrocotyle phoenix — fire pennywort
- Hydrocotyle prolifera — whorled marshpennywort
- Hydrocotyle pusilla — tropical marshpennywort
- Hydrocotyle ranunculoides — floating marshpennywort, floating marshpennywort, floating pennyroyal
- Hydrocotyle sibthorpioides — lawn marshpennywort
- Hydrocotyle tambalomaensis
- Hydrocotyle tripartita
- Hydrocotyle umbellata — manyflower marshpennywort, umbrella pennyroyal
- Hydrocotyle verticillata — whorled marshpennywort, whorled marshpennywort, whorled pennyroyal
- Hydrocotyle vulgaris — marsh pennywort, common pennywort
- Hydrocotyle yanghuangensis

== Distribution ==
Hydrocotyleae grow in wet and damp places in the tropics and the temperate zones.

== Fossil record ==
One fossil fruit of a Hydrocotyle sp. has been extracted from borehole samples of the Middle Miocene fresh water deposits in Nowy Sacz Basin, West Carpathians, Poland.
