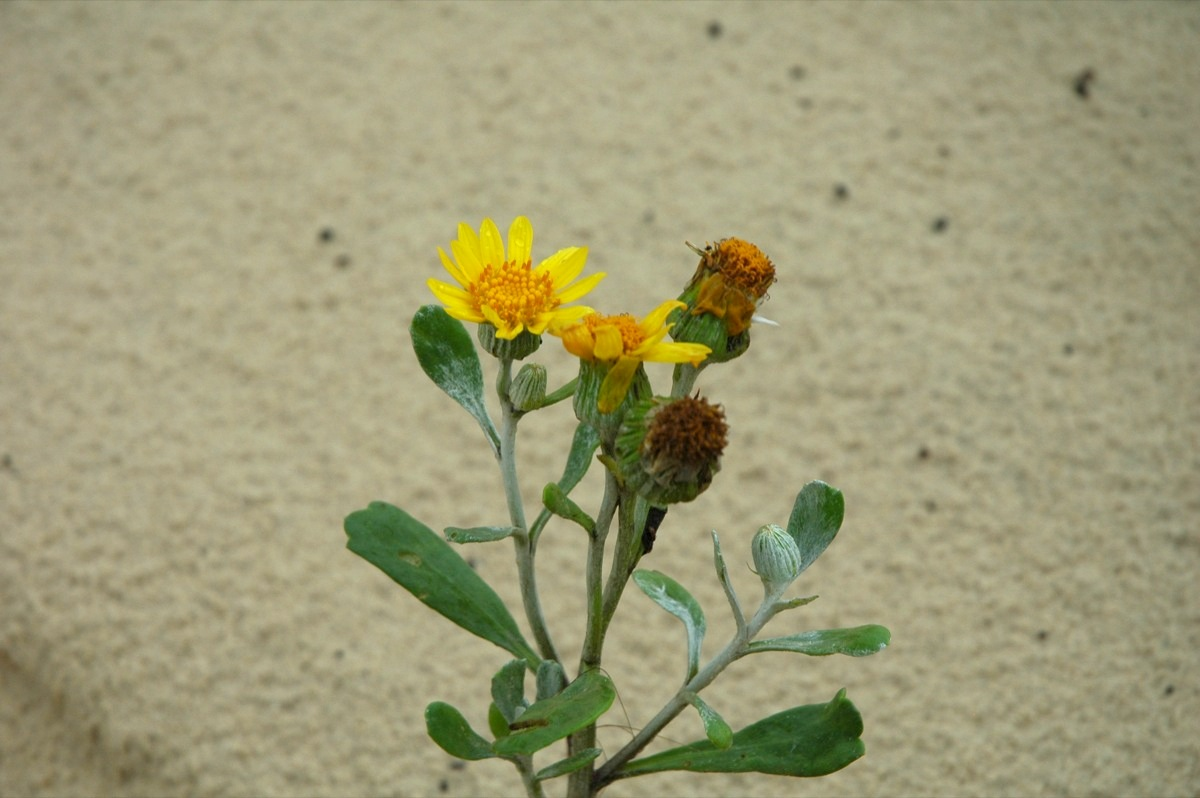
- Margarida das dunas

Scientific classification
- Kingdom: Plantae
- Clade: Tracheophytes
- Clade: Angiosperms
- Clade: Eudicots
- Clade: Asterids
- Order: Asterales
- Family: Asteraceae
- Genus: Senecio
- Species: S. crassiflorus

Binomial name
- Senecio crassiflorus (Poir.) DC.

Synonyms
- Cineraria crassiflora Poir. Senecio crassiflorus (Lam.) DC. Senecio vestita Spreng. Cineraria vestita Lam. Senecio andryaloides DC. Prodr.

= Senecio crassiflorus =

Species of flowering plant

Senecio crassiflorus, in Portuguese: margarida-das-dunas, one of the native South American Senecio and an herbaceous dune dwelling perennial.

== Description ==
Senecio crassiflorus is not an upright herb, the silvery to white woolly 20 centimetres (7.9 in) to 50 centimetres (20 in) tall plant tends to "lay down and rest" on the dunes and sandy coastal areas it inhabits.

Leaves
Shaped like spatula with roundish, long, narrow, linear bases to having a broad rounded apex and a tapering base. Mostly 4 centimetres (1.6 in) to 8 centimetres (3.1 in) long, .6 centimetres (0.24 in) to 2 centimetres (0.79 in) wide. The edges are smooth or toothed towards apex and both surfaces woolly.

Flowers
Broadly bell shaped, woolly flower heads appear singly or a few together, 1 centimetre (0.39 in) to 1.5 centimetres (0.59 in) in diameter.

Seeds and reproduction
Achenes .3 centimetres (0.12 in) to .5 centimetres (0.20 in); pappus 1.5 centimetres (0.59 in) long.

Reports claim S. crassiflorus does not produce viable seeds and spreads itself asexually or via vegetative reproduction.

== Community species ==
- Ipomoea pes-caprae
- Hydrocotyle bonariensis
- Juncus acutus
- Panicum sabularum
- Spartina cf. ciliata
- Hydrocotyle umbellata

=== Colombian communities ===
In a remote sensing project for rapid ecological evaluation, S. crassiflorus was found in Colombia inhabiting two areas that were evaluated.

A flood prone coastal region:

- Acanthospermum australe
- Acicarpha tribuloides
- Ambrosia tenuifolia
- Androtrichium trigynum
- Azolla sp.
- Bacopa monnieri
- Baccharis articulata
- Cardionema ramosissima
- Centella asiatica
- Cephalanthus glabratus
- Chenopodium retusum
- Cuphea carthagenensis
- Cynodon dactylon
- Cyperus haspan
- Cyperus virens
- Enydra sessilis
- Erechtites hieracifolia
- Eryngium pandanifolium
- Hedyotis salzmanii
- Ischaemum minus
- Juncus microcephalus
- Nymphoides indica
- Panicum racemosum
- Paspalum nicorae
- Persicaria punctata
- Petunia litoralis
- Pluchea sagitalis
- Pterocaulon sp.
- Ranunculus apiifolius
- Sesbania punicea
- Solanum platense
- Thelipteris interrupta
- Xyris jupicai
- Zizaniopsis bonariensis

A sandy area near to a forest:

- Acanthospermun australe
- Baccharis arenaria
- Cynodon dactylon
- Fragmites communis
- Hydrocotyle bonariensis
- Mikania micrantha
- Myrcianthes cisplatensis
- Oenothera sp.
- Passiflora caerulea
- Polygonum sp.
- Salyx hunboldtiana
- Sapium glandulosum
- Schoenoplectus californicus
- Sebastiania schottiana
- Sesbania punicea
- Theliptheris interrupta
- Tillandsia aeranthos

== Distribution ==
Native
Neotropic:

Brazil: Brazil
Southern South America: Argentina, Uruguay

Current
Neotropic:

Brazil: Brazil
Southern South America: Argentina, Uruguay

Australasia:

Australia: New South Wales
New Zealand North: Wellington
