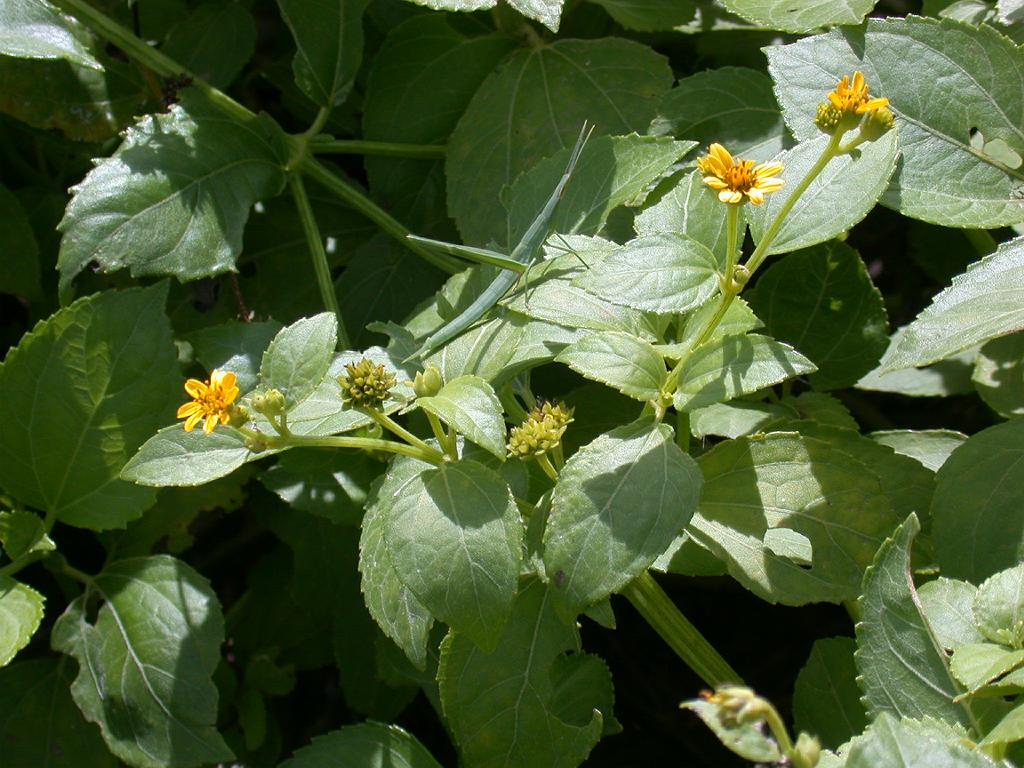
- Wollastonia biflora

Scientific classification
- Kingdom: Plantae
- Clade: Tracheophytes
- Clade: Angiosperms
- Clade: Eudicots
- Clade: Asterids
- Order: Asterales
- Family: Asteraceae
- Subfamily: Asteroideae
- Tribe: Heliantheae
- Subtribe: Ecliptinae
- Genus: Wollastonia; DC. ex Decne.

Species
- 8; see text

Synonyms
- Anthemiopsis Bojer ex DC.; Aphanopappus Endl.; Niebuhria Neck. ex Britten; Schizophyllum Nutt.

= Wollastonia (plant) =

Genus of flowering plant

Wollastonia is a genus of flowering plants in the family Asteraceae. It includes eight species which range from Mozambique and KwaZulu-Natal in southeastern Africa to the western Indian Ocean, tropical and subtropical Asia, Australia, and the Pacific Islands.

The most common species of this genus is Wollastonia biflora, found in the coastal areas and islands of the tropical belt of the Indo-Pacific region. Together with Portulaca oleracea, Ipomoea pes-caprae and Digitaria ciliaris, Wollastonia biflora is usually one of the first species colonizing degraded or altered environments in tropical zones of the planet.

== Species ==
Eight species are accepted.

- Wollastonia biflora (L.) DC.
- Wollastonia dentata (H.Lév. & Vaniot) Orchard
- Wollastonia elongata DC.
- Wollastonia glabrata DC.
- Wollastonia lifuana (Hochr.) Fosberg
- Wollastonia scabriuscula Sch.Bip. ex Miq.
- Wollastonia serrulata Miq.
- Wollastonia uniflora (Willd.) Orchard
