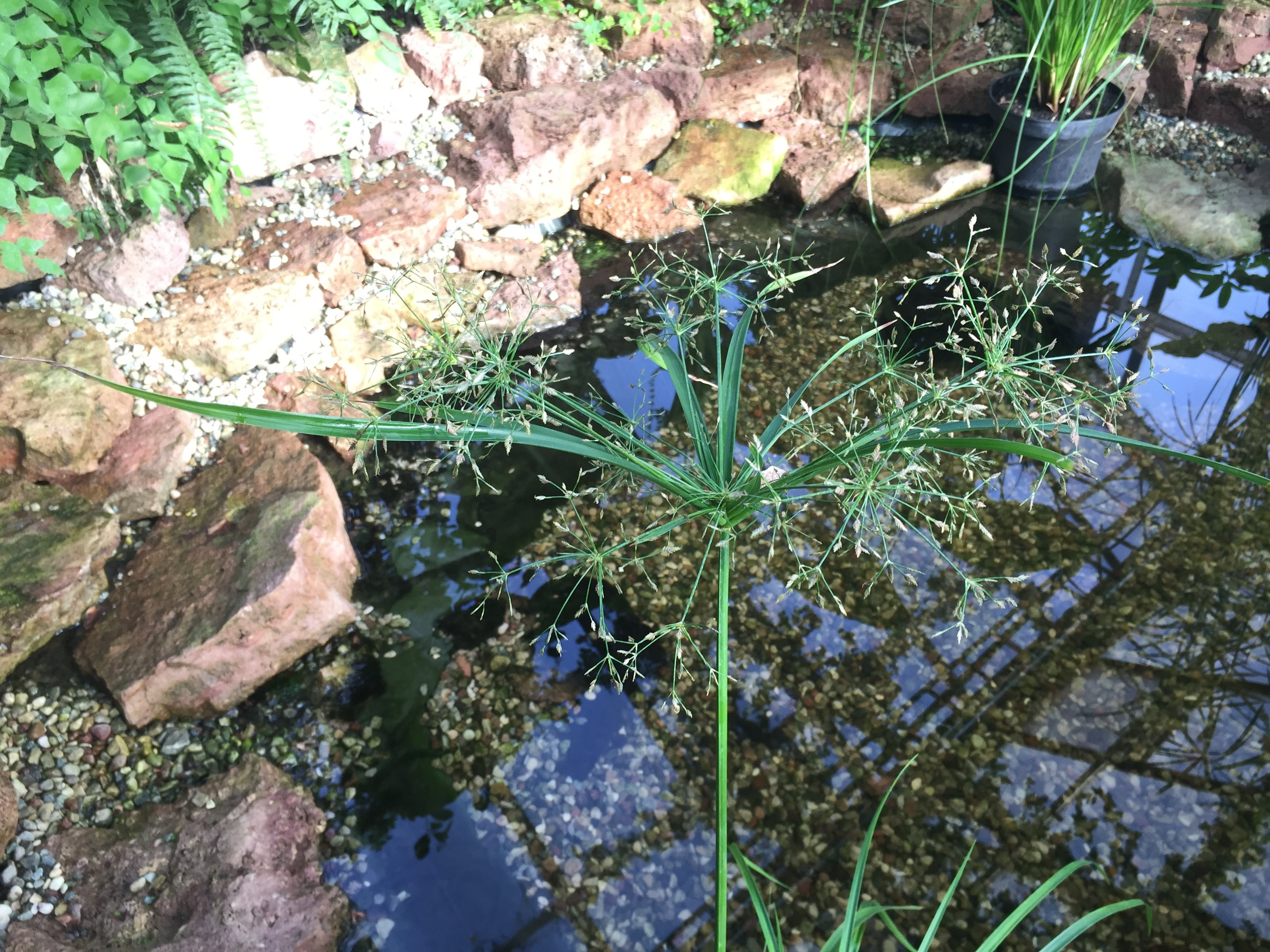

Scientific classification
- Kingdom: Plantae
- Clade: Tracheophytes
- Clade: Angiosperms
- Clade: Monocots
- Clade: Commelinids
- Order: Poales
- Family: Cyperaceae
- Genus: Cyperus
- Species: C. textilis

Binomial name
- Cyperus textilis Thunb.

= Cyperus textilis =

Species of grass-like plant

Cyperus textilis (flat sedge, basket grass, umbrella sedge, mat sedge) is a sedge in the family Cyperaceae. It is endemic to southern parts of South Africa where it grows near rivers and other water reservoirs.

Cyperus textilis is used to make baskets, sleeping mats, rolled twine and other woven articles.

== Description ==
Cyperus textilis can grow to be 1 to 3 meters tall. It forms clumps like other Cyperus species and is similar to the commonly kept plant C. alternifolius.
