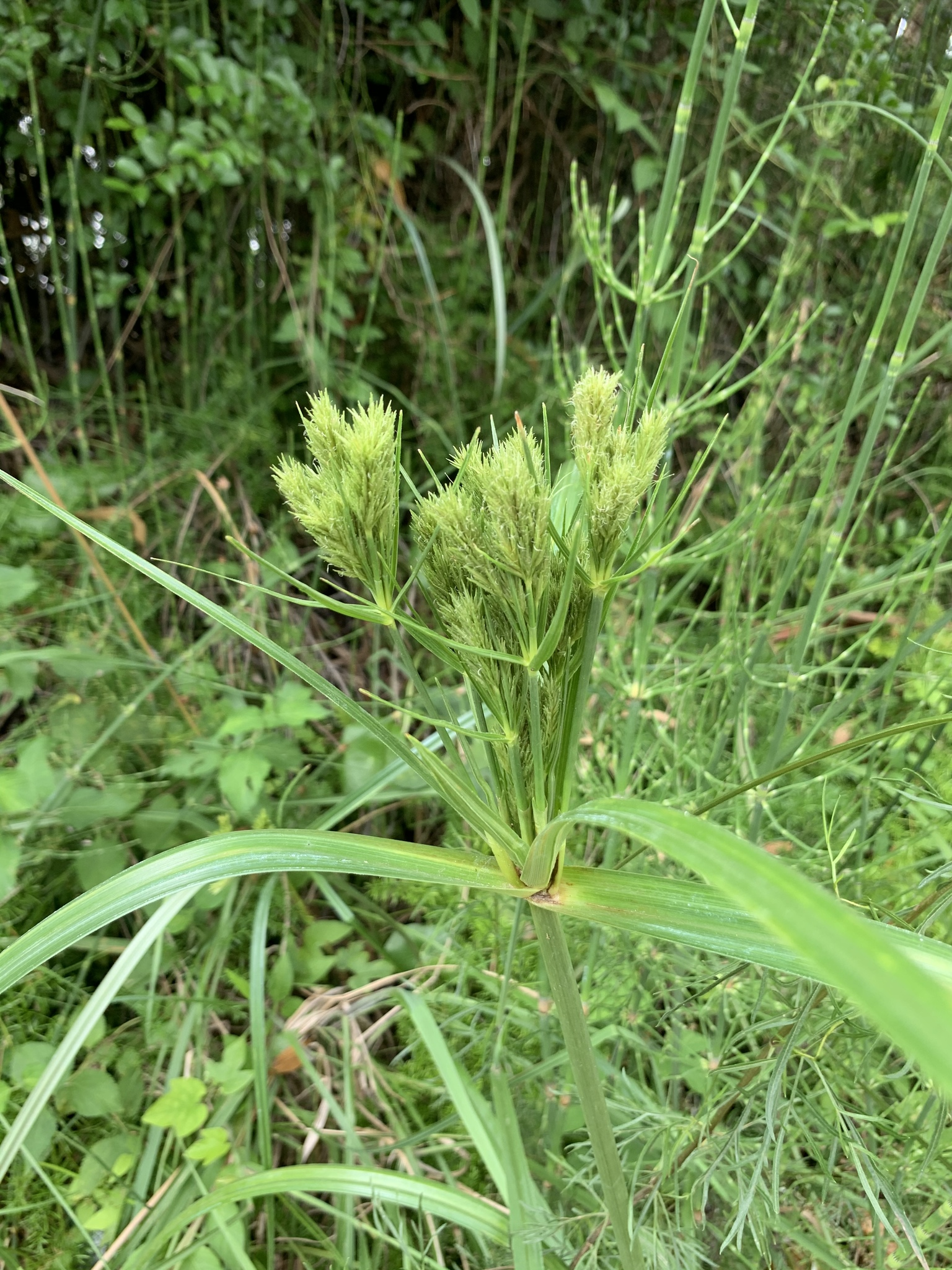

Scientific classification
- Kingdom: Plantae
- Clade: Embryophytes
- Clade: Tracheophytes
- Clade: Spermatophytes
- Clade: Angiosperms
- Clade: Monocots
- Clade: Commelinids
- Order: Poales
- Family: Cyperaceae
- Genus: Cyperus
- Species: C. prolixus

Binomial name
- Cyperus prolixus Kunth

Synonyms
- Chlorocyperus prolixus (Kunth) Palla; Comostemum prolixum (Kunth) Nees; Comostemum schottii Nees; Cyperus amplissimus Steud.; Cyperus bisumbellatus Steud.; Cyperus longeradiatus Steud.; Cyperus multifolius Kunth; Cyperus penicillatus Conz.; Cyperus prolixus var. vialis (Ridl.) Kük.; Cyperus schottii (Nees) D.Dietr.; Cyperus vialis Ridl.; Mariscus multifolius (Kunth) T.Koyama; Mariscus polyphyllus Kunth

= Cyperus prolixus =

Species of plant native to the Americas

Cyperus prolixus is a species of sedge that is native to southern parts of North America, Central America and tropical parts of South America. It is a perennial plant that grows up to 2 meters (6 ft 7 in) tall. The leaves are long and narrow, and the flowers are small and white. Cyperus prolixus is found in a variety of habitats, including wetlands, meadows, and roadsides. It is a common plant and is not considered to be threatened or endangered.

The species was first formally described by the botanist Carl Sigismund Kunth in 1816.

== Description ==
Cyperus prolixus is a perennial plant with a stout, erect rhizome. The culms are erect, trigonous, and 50–300 cm (20–120 in) tall. The leaves are basal, V-shaped, and 40–130 cm (16–51 in) long. The inflorescence is a compound umbel with 9–12 rays, each ray up to 22 cm (8.7 in) long. The spikelets are linear, 7–12 mm long, and contain 6–20 flowers.

== Ecology ==
Cyperus prolixus is a pioneer species that often colonizes disturbed areas. The plant is pollinated by insects and the seeds are dispersed by wind. Cyperus prolixus is a food source for a variety of animals, including waterfowl, rodents, and insects.

== See also ==
- List of Cyperus species
