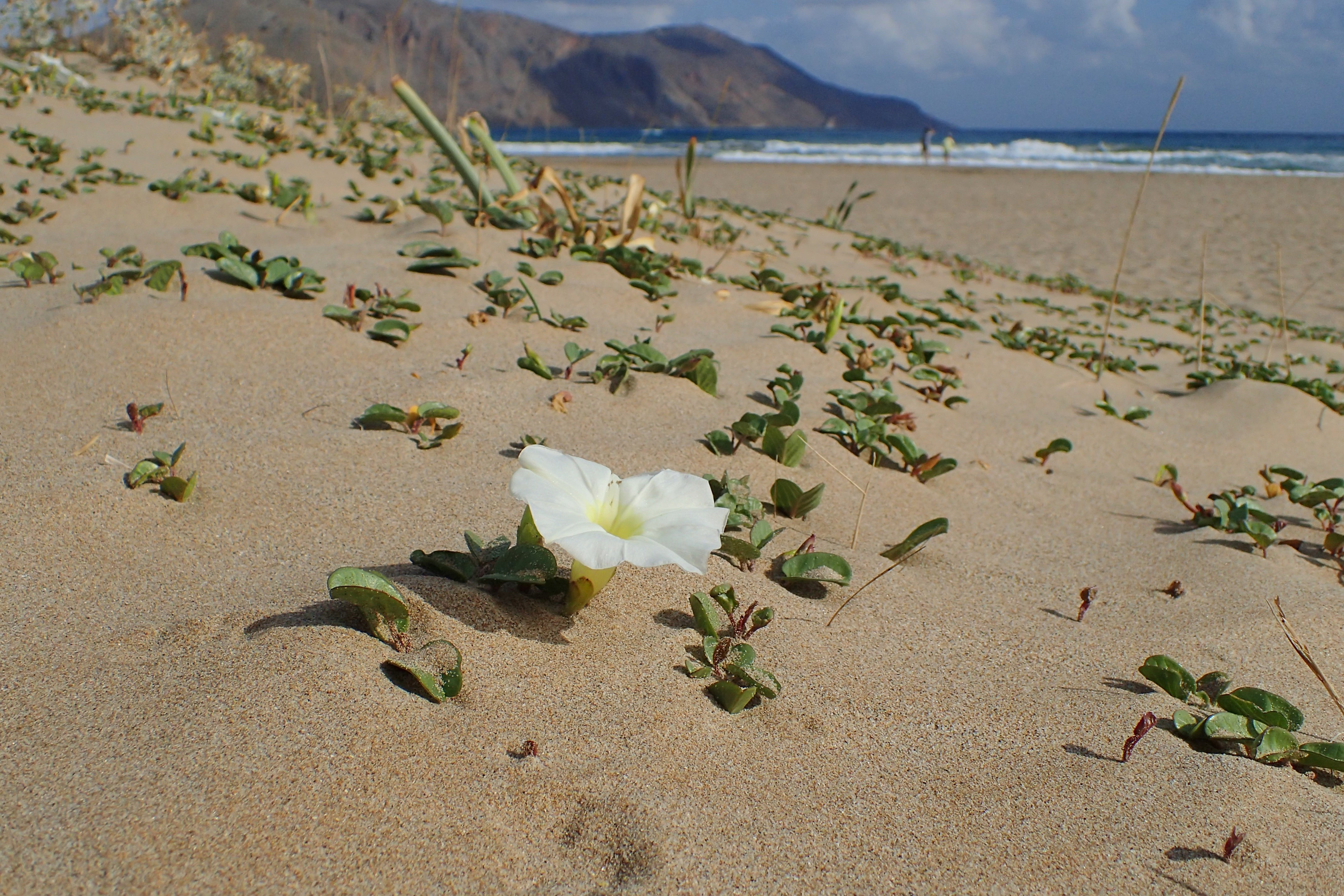
- Spreading across a beach in Greece

Scientific classification
- Kingdom: Plantae
- Clade: Embryophytes
- Clade: Tracheophytes
- Clade: Angiosperms
- Clade: Eudicots
- Clade: Asterids
- Order: Solanales
- Family: Convolvulaceae
- Genus: Ipomoea
- Species: I. imperati

Binomial name
- Ipomoea imperati (Vahl) Griseb.

= Ipomoea imperati =

Species of flowering plant

Ipomoea imperati, the beach morning-glory (a name it shares with Ipomoea pes-caprae), is a species of flowering plant in the family Convolvulaceae. Like Ipomoea pes-caprae, its seeds disperse by floating in seawater. It has been found on the sandy shores of every continent except Antarctica.

Ipomoea imperati and I. pes-caprae can be easily can be distinguished in that I. imperati has white flowers and I. pes-caprae usually has purple flowers. The leaves of I. imperati are more linear or lanceolate while those of I. pes-caprae tend to be more circular or ovate.

It is considered an invasive species in some places.

== Gallery ==
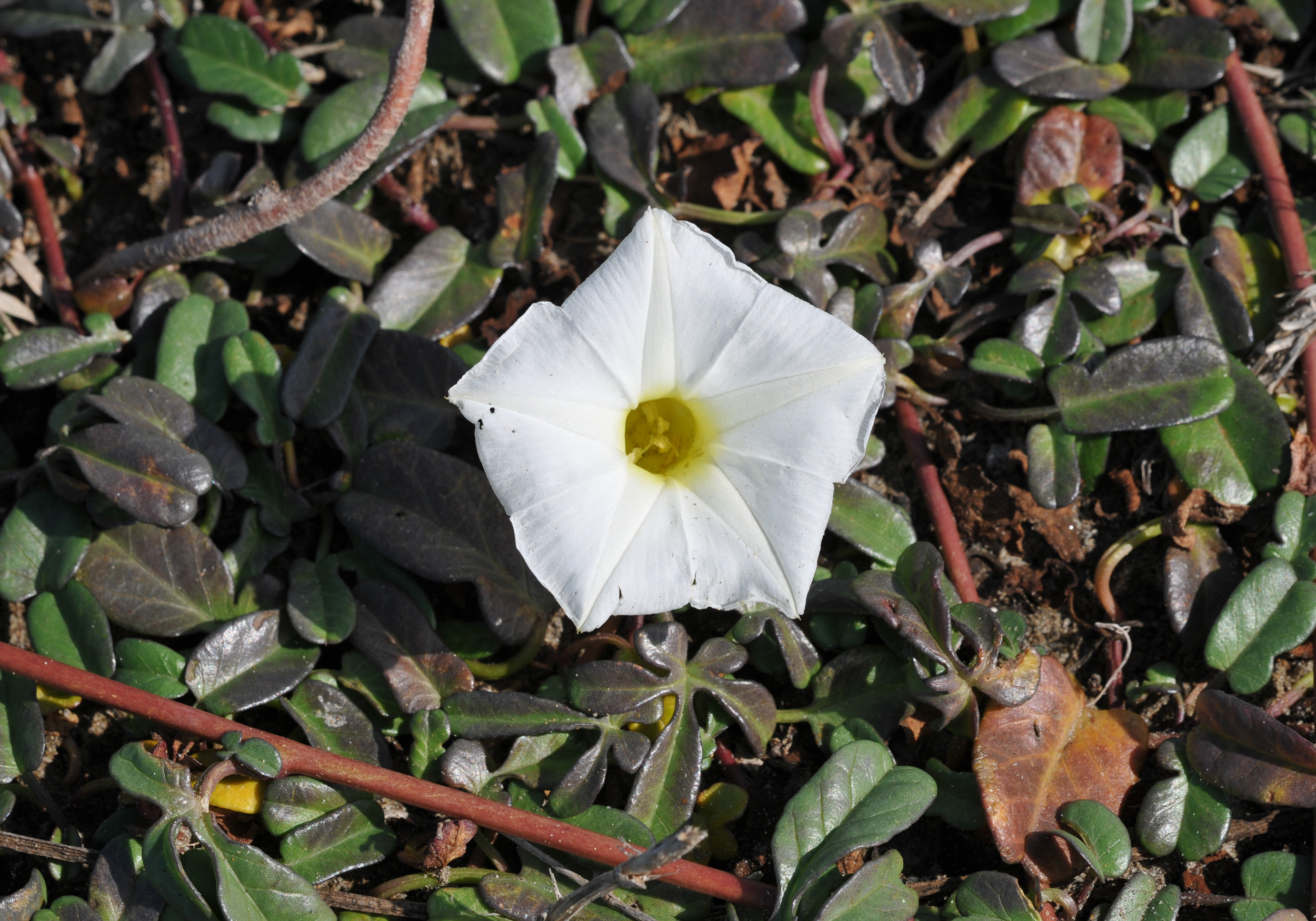
Flower

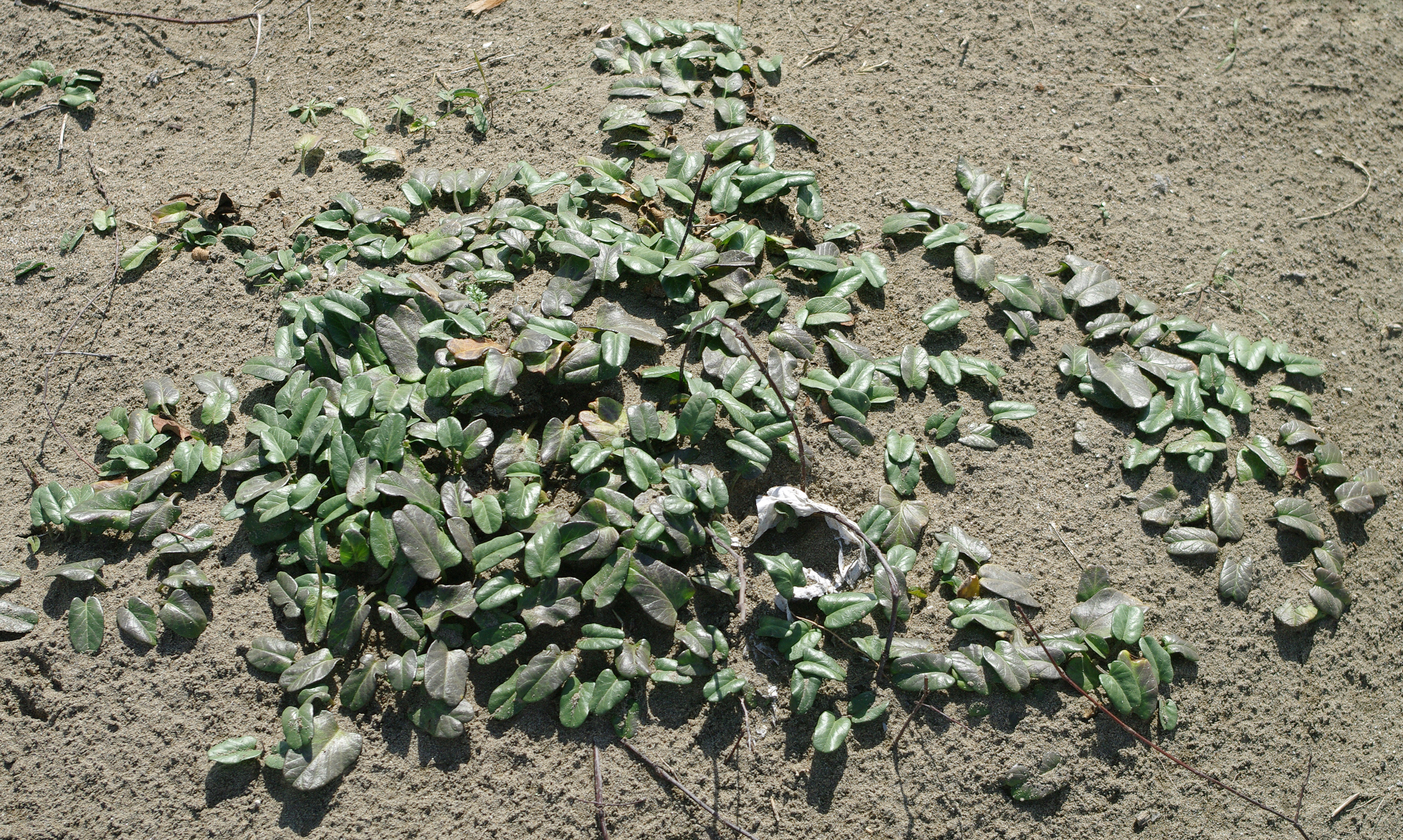
Leaves

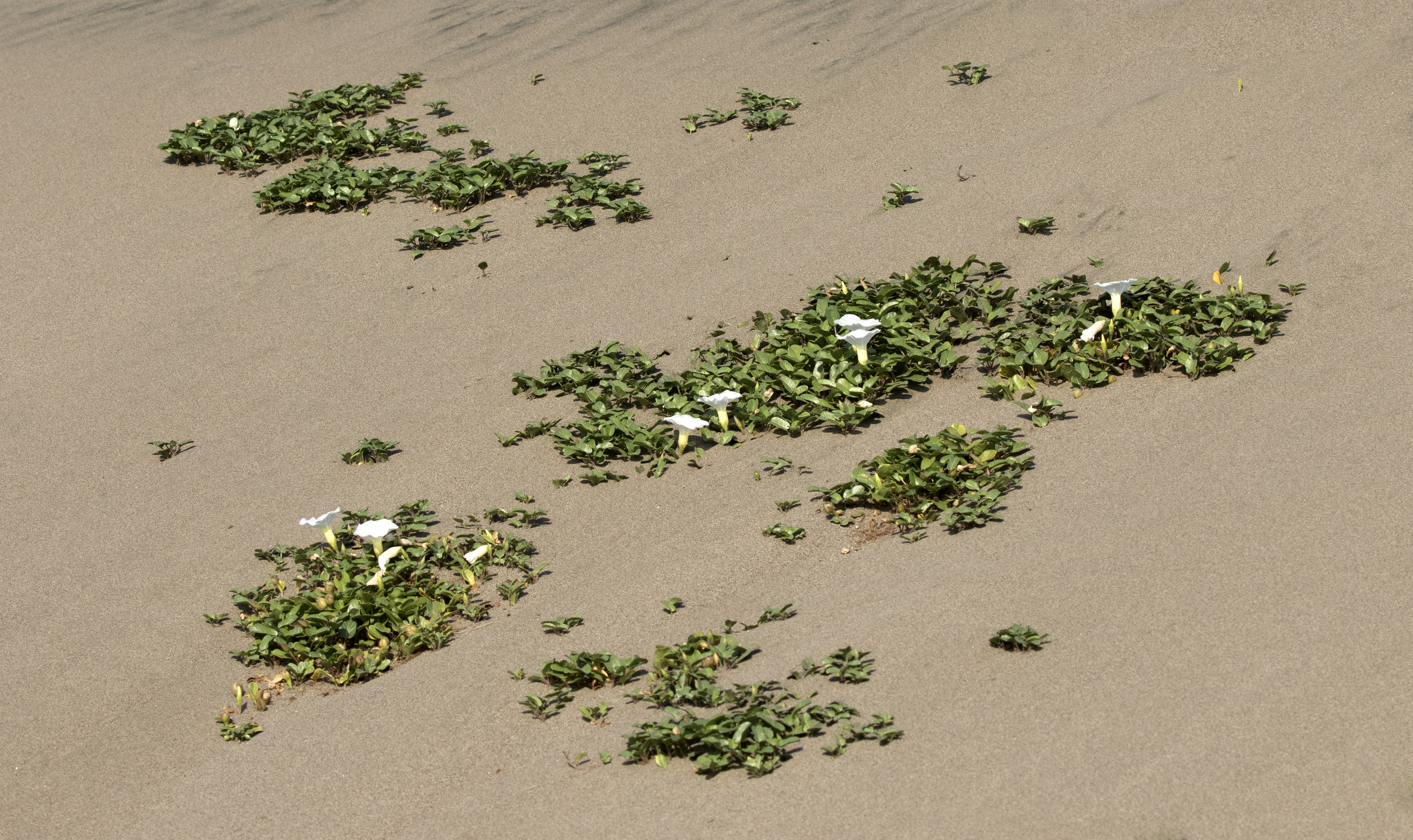
I. imperati colony on a beach
