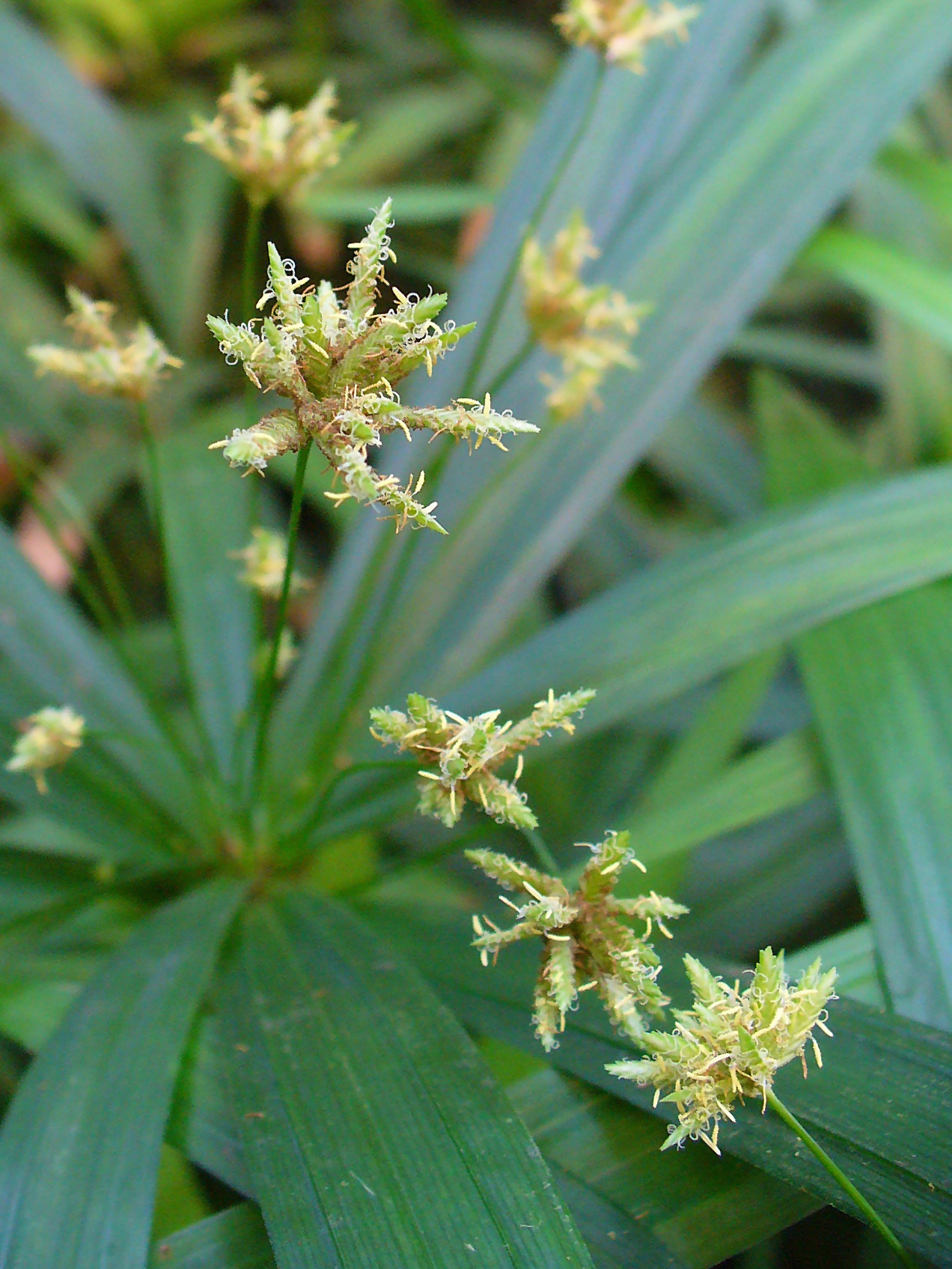

Scientific classification
- Kingdom: Plantae
- Clade: Tracheophytes
- Clade: Angiosperms
- Clade: Monocots
- Clade: Commelinids
- Order: Poales
- Family: Cyperaceae
- Genus: Cyperus
- Species: C. albostriatus

Binomial name
- Cyperus albostriatus Schrad.

= Cyperus albostriatus =

Species of sedge

Cyperus albostriatus is a species of sedge that is native to southern parts of Africa, ranging from Mozambique and Zambia to South Africa.

== See also ==
- List of Cyperus species
