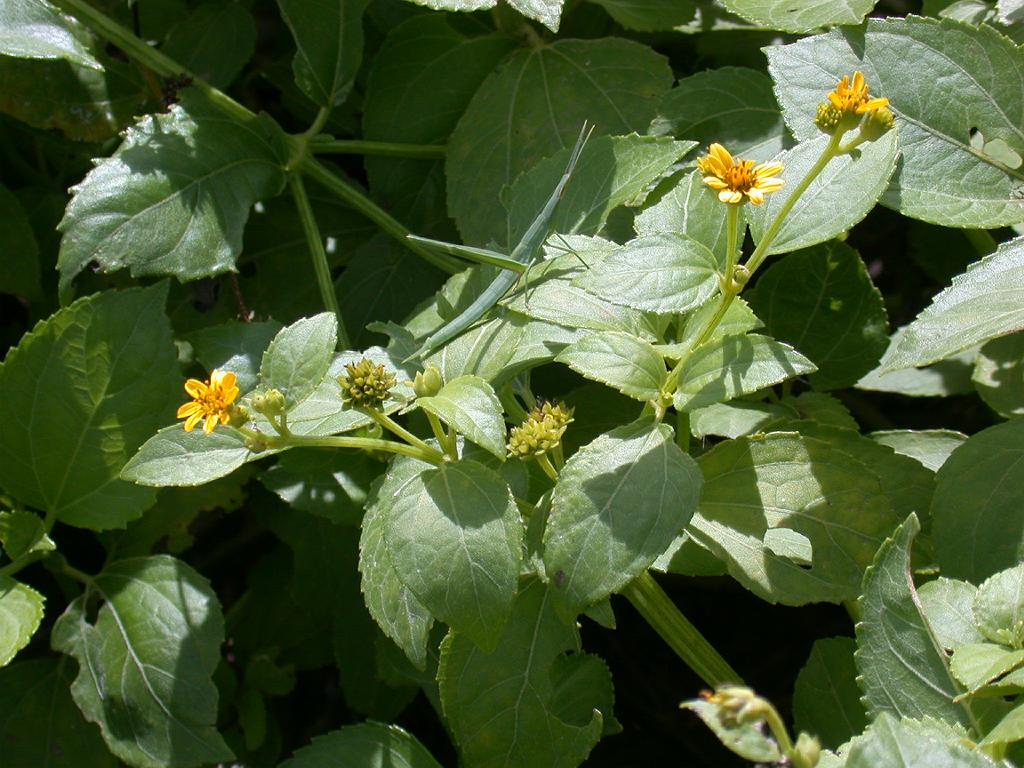

Conservation status
- Secure (NatureServe)

Scientific classification
- Kingdom: Plantae
- Clade: Embryophytes
- Clade: Tracheophytes
- Clade: Angiosperms
- Clade: Eudicots
- Clade: Asterids
- Order: Asterales
- Family: Asteraceae
- Tribe: Heliantheae
- Genus: Wollastonia
- Species: W. biflora

Binomial name
- Wollastonia biflora (L.) DC.

Varieties
- Wollastonia biflora var. biflora; Wollastonia biflora var. canescens (Gaudich.) Fosberg; Wollastonia biflora var. ryukyuensis (H.Koyama) Orchard

Synonyms
- Acmella biflora (L.) Spreng.; Adenostemma biflorum (L.) Less.; Buphthalmum australe Spreng.; Eclipta scabriuscula Wall.; Melanthera biflora (L.) Wild; Niebuhria biflora (L.) Britten; Seruneum biflorum (L.) Kuntze; Spilanthes peregrina Blanco; Stemmodontia biflora (L.); Stemmodontia canescens (Gaudich.); Verbesina aquatilis Burm.; Verbesina argentea Gaudich.; Verbesina biflora L.; Verbesina canescens Gaudich.; Verbesina strigulosa Gaudich.; Wedelia argentea (Gaudich.) Merr.; Wedelia biflora (L.) DC.; Wedelia canescens (Gaudich.) Merr.; Wedelia chamissonis Less.; Wedelia glabrata (DC.) Boerl.; Wedelia rechingeriana Muschl.; Wedelia strigulosa (Gaudich.) K.Schum.; Wedelia tiliifolia Rechinger & Muschl.; Wollastonia canescens DC.; Wollastonia glabrata DC.; Wollastonia insularis DC.; Wollastonia scabriuscula DC. ex Decne.; Wollastonia strigulosa (Gaudich.); Wollastonia zanzibarensis DC.

= Wollastonia biflora =

Species of flowering plant

Wollastonia biflora (syn. Melanthera biflora) also known as sea daisy, beach daisy and sea ox-eye, is a species of flowering plant in the family Asteraceae. It is a scandent, rough-looking and fast-growing plant with a wide distribution.

== Distribution ==
Wollastonia biflora is a moderately salt-tolerant plant found in the tropical belt of the Indo-Pacific region, including China, the Indian subcontinent, Southeast Asia, Taiwan, Queensland, and islands of the Pacific such as Fiji, Niue, Tonga, Samoa and the Cook Islands.

It is found commonly in islands and in coastal areas, although it sometimes occurs inland in neglected and unmanaged plantations as well as in ruderal environments.

Together with Portulaca oleracea, Ipomoea pes-caprae and Digitaria ciliaris, Wollastonia biflora is usually one of the first species colonizing degraded or altered environments in tropical zones of the planet.

== Description ==
Wollastonia biflora is a hardy and somewhat woody, sprawling perennial herb or subshrub. Stems are elongated and branched; they can reach up to 2 m but will bend after reaching a certain height.

It can scramble and straggle over the ground or climb leaning on other plants for support. The leaves are ovate, shortly tapering at the base. It produces small yellow flower heads with a diameter of about 8–10 mm. The fruits form a dense head.

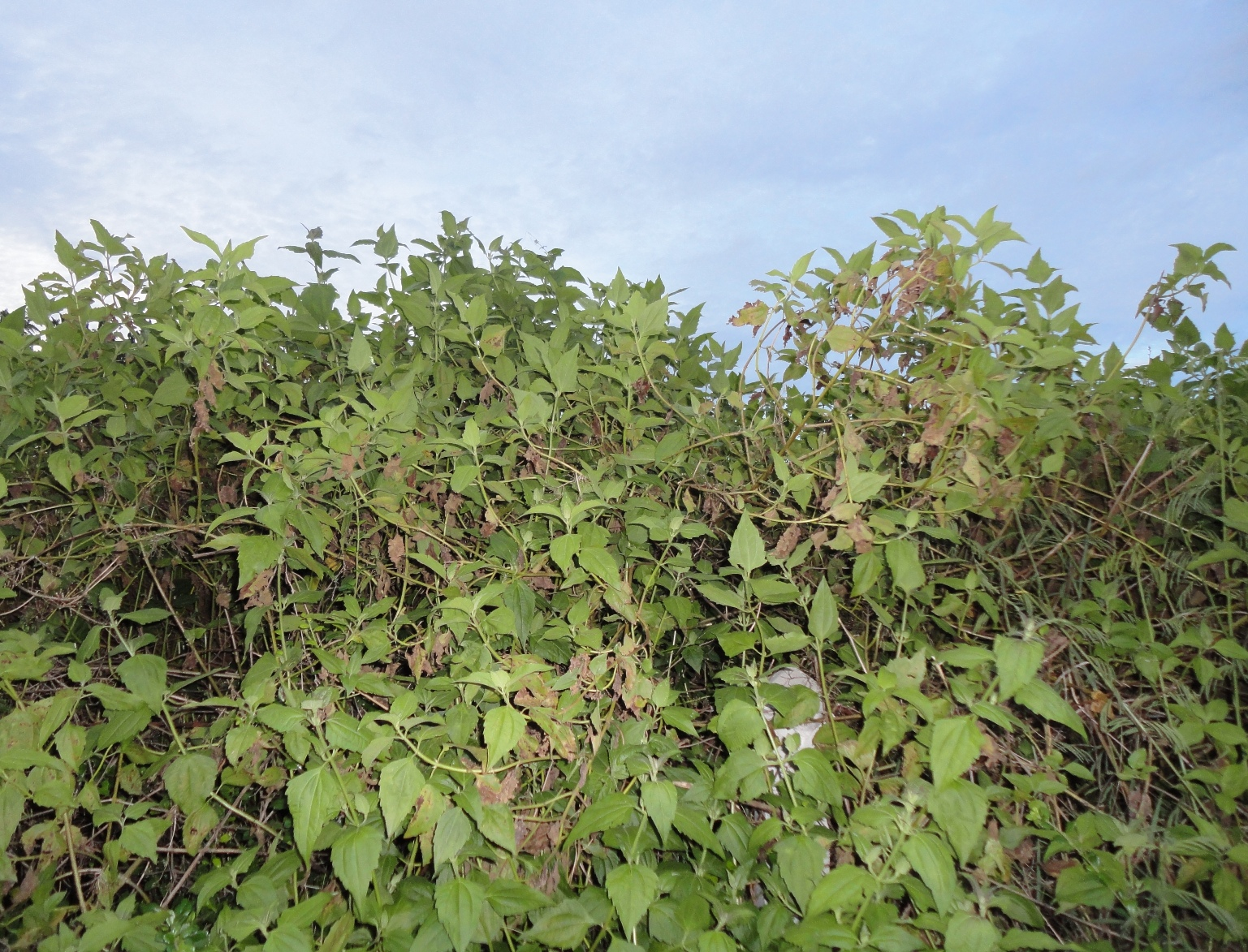
General appearance of the plant

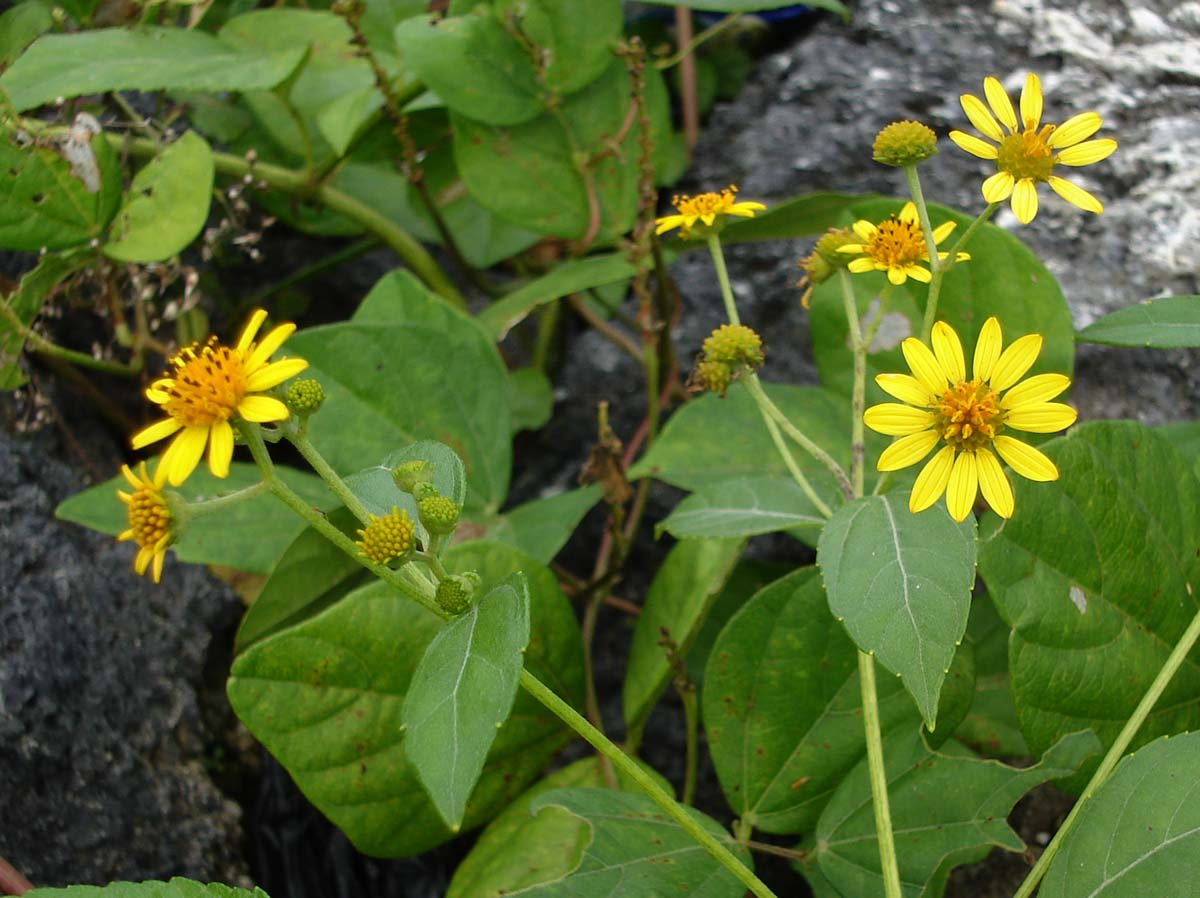
Flowering plant from Tonga growing along the seashore

== Uses ==
Despite the rough appearance of the plant, the leaves are edible. In Malaysian cuisine the shoots are eaten cooked as a leaf vegetable and in Langkawi they are eaten raw with chilli and sambal shrimp paste. Leaves also have traditional medicinal uses as poultice or as decoction.

Wollastonia biflora has traditionally been used as a medicinal plant in many cultures, including in Marovo in the Solomon Islands. Leaves are especially valued against stomach ache. In Fiji the leaves are used to treat acne. Root extracts have anthelmintic properties and flowers can be used as a purgative.

This plant is also used as fodder for rabbits.
