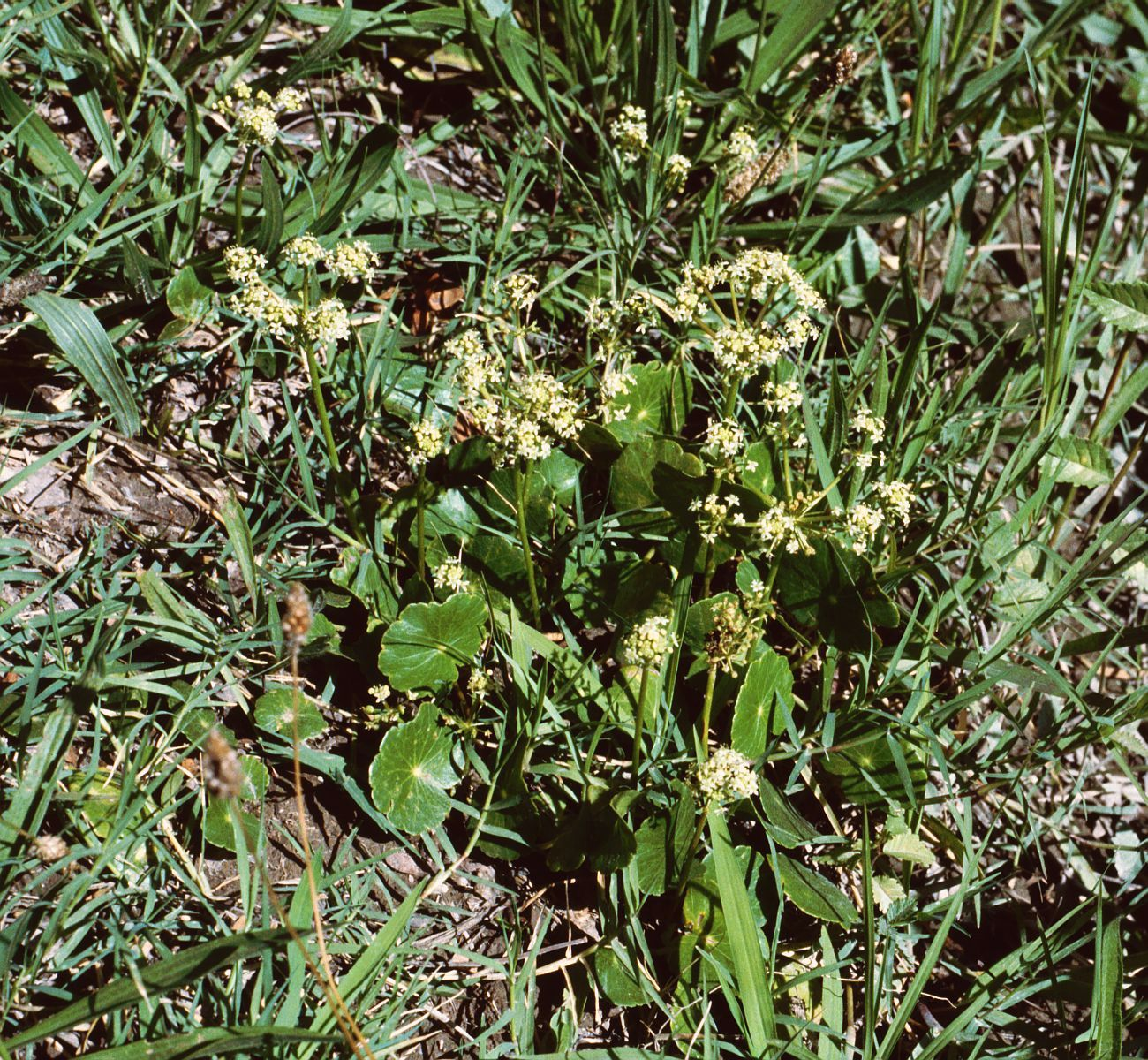
- Largeleaf pennywort

Scientific classification
- Kingdom: Plantae
- Clade: Tracheophytes
- Clade: Angiosperms
- Clade: Eudicots
- Clade: Asterids
- Order: Apiales
- Family: Araliaceae
- Genus: Hydrocotyle
- Species: H. bonariensis

Binomial name
- Hydrocotyle bonariensis Lam.
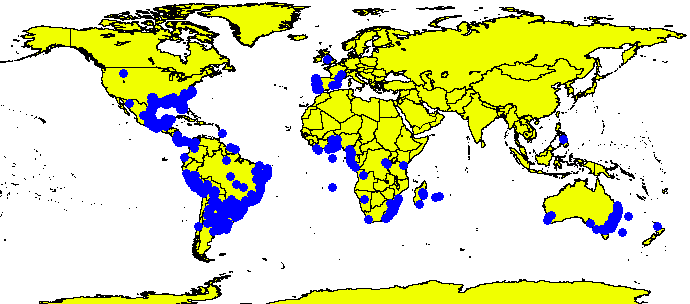
- Occurrence data from GBIF

Synonyms
- Hydrocotyle bonariensis Comm. ex Lam. Hydrocotyle multiflora Ruiz & Pav. Hydrocotyle petiolaris DC. Hydrocotyle yucatanensis Millsp. Hydrocotyle caffra Meisn.

= Hydrocotyle bonariensis =

Species of flowering plant

Hydrocotyle bonariensis, the largeleaf pennywort, once a member of the family Apiaceae, now in the family Araliaceae and of the genus Hydrocotyle, is a hairless and creeping perennial.

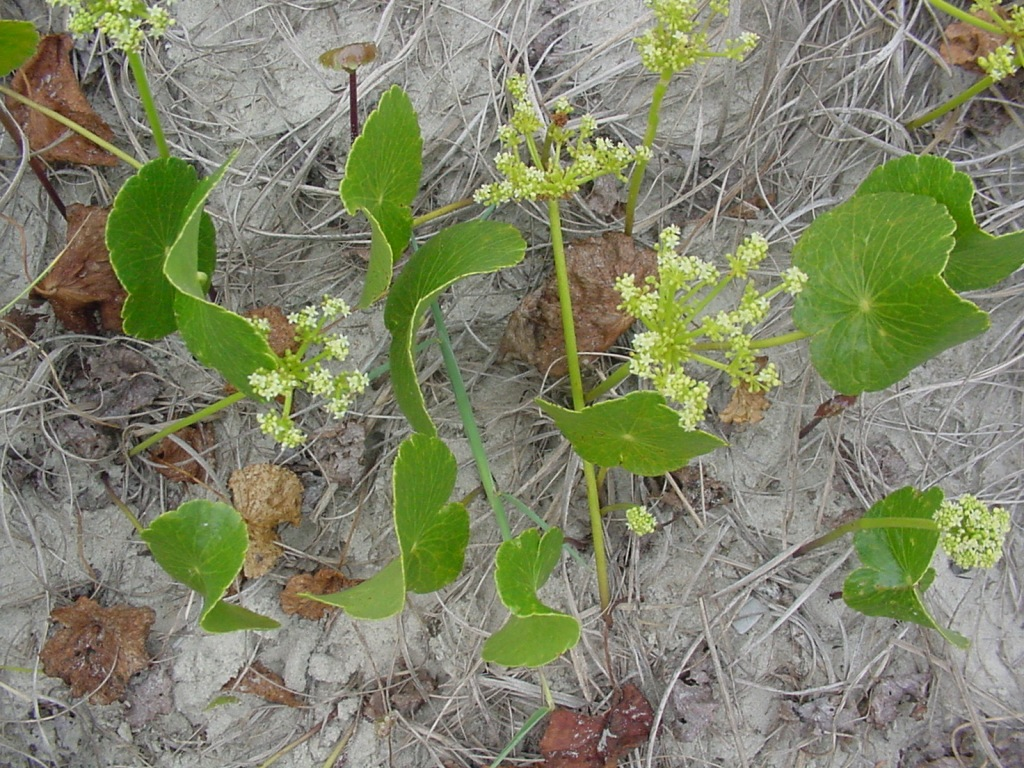
Hydrocotyle bonariensis

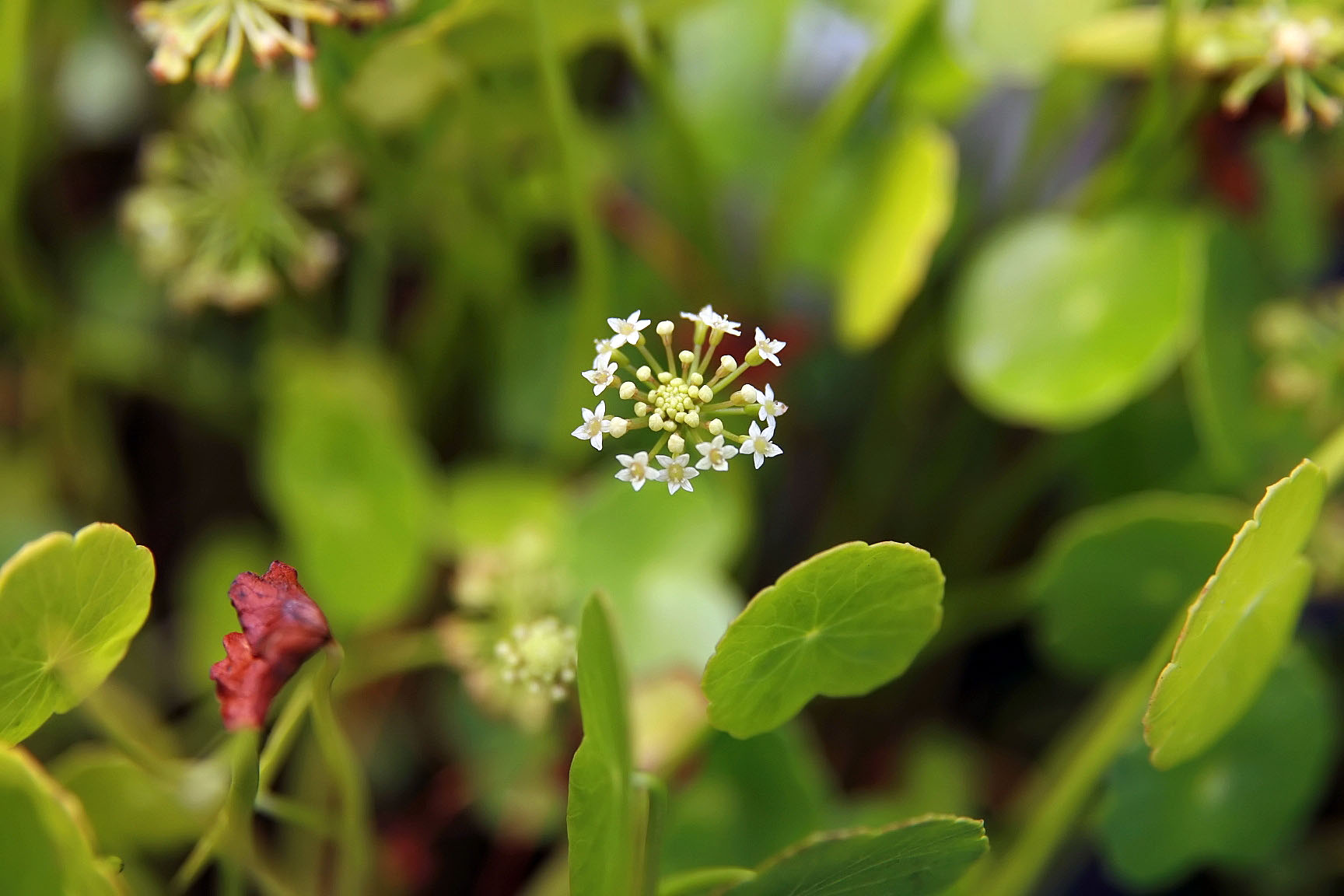

== Description ==
Flowers
This plant has numerous white to creamy-yellow flowers, and the flower stalks can be 30 centimetres (12 in) in height.
Fruits and reproduction
The stems creep and root at the nodes; the plant spreads by rhizomes. Dollar Weed produces a dry dehiscent fruit that, at maturity, splits into two or more parts each with a single seed.
Habitat
This plant lives in sandy areas of somewhat extreme conditions: very dry lands that are flooded sometimes.

Community species:

- Ipomoea pes-caprae
- Senecio crassiflorus
- Juncus acutus

Co-dominate species:

- Imperata brasiliensis
- Bacopa monnieri

== Distribution ==
This species colonizes sandy ground and disturbed foreshore sites, estuaries, coastline, sand dunes and ponds. H. bonariensis has also displayed a tendency to prefer, and be stronger at, higher elevations.

Native
Afrotropic:

West-Central Tropical Africa: Cameroon
West Tropical Africa: Côte d'Ivoire, Ghana, Liberia, Nigeria, Senegal
South Tropical Africa: Angola, Mozambique
Southern Africa: South Africa
Western Indian Ocean: Madagascar, Mauritius, Réunion

Nearctic:

Southeastern United States: Alabama, Florida, Georgia, Louisiana, Mississippi, North Carolina, South Carolina
South-Central United States: Texas

Neotropic:

Central America: Costa Rica, Guatemala, Nicaragua, Panama
Caribbean: Cuba, Puerto Rico
Northern South America: Venezuela
Brazil: Brazil
Western South America: Bolivia, Colombia, Peru
Southern South America: Argentina, Chile, Paraguay, Uruguay

== Neighbors ==
Colombian communities: In a remote sensing project for rapid ecological evaluation, H. bonariensis was found in Colombia inhabiting several of the evaluated areas; the last two communities are considered exceptional for the diversity.
