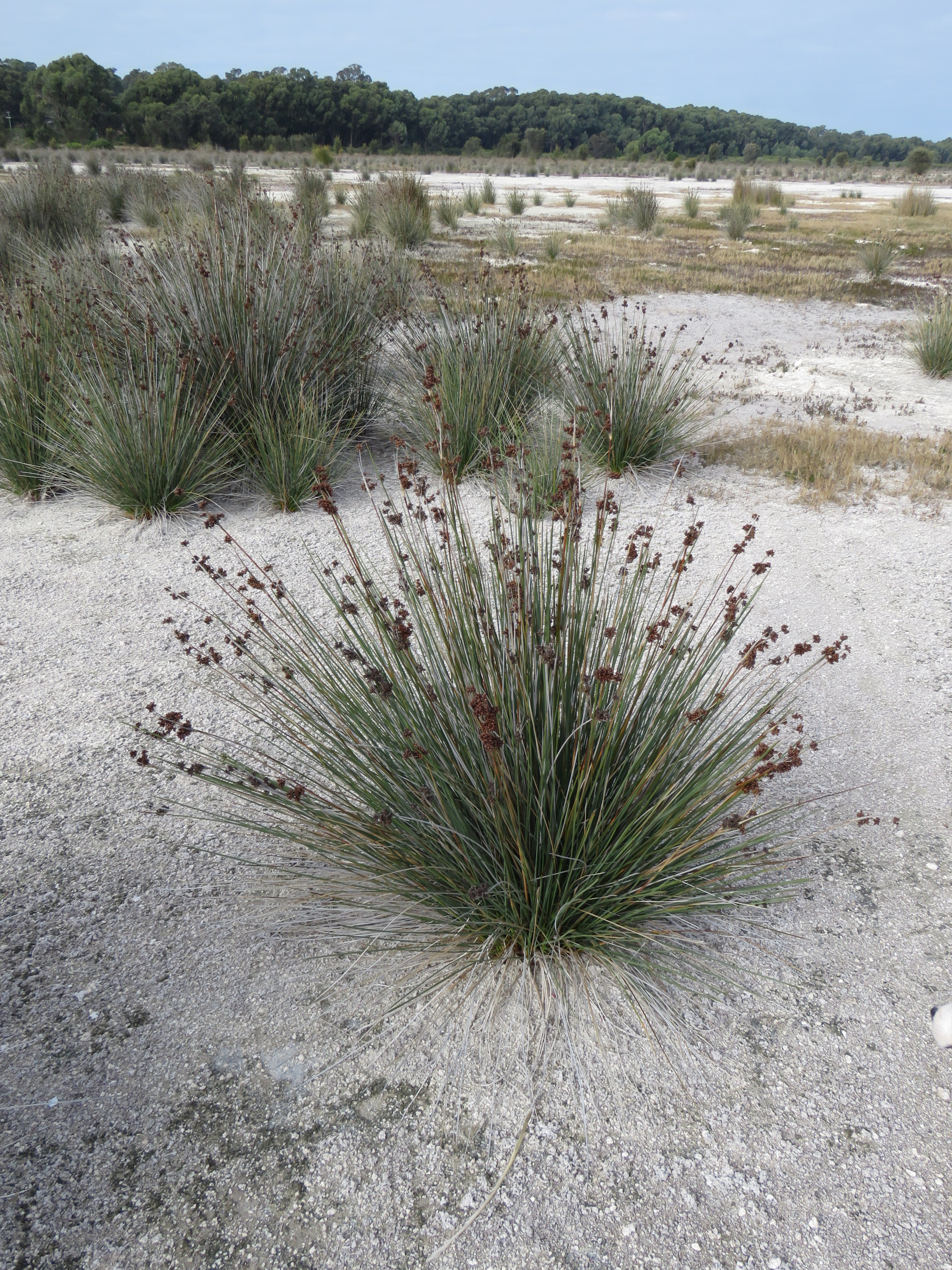
- Lake Walyungup, Rockingham Lakes Regional Park

Scientific classification
- Kingdom: Plantae
- Clade: Embryophytes
- Clade: Tracheophytes
- Clade: Spermatophytes
- Clade: Angiosperms
- Clade: Monocots
- Clade: Commelinids
- Order: Poales
- Family: Juncaceae
- Genus: Juncus
- Species: J. acutus

Binomial name
- Juncus acutus L.

= Juncus acutus =

Species of rush

Juncus acutus, the spiny rush, sharp rush or sharp-pointed rush, is a flowering plant in the monocot family Juncaceae. It is native to the Americas, Northern and Southern Africa, Western and Southern Europe and West Asia, and is found in a variety of wet habitats, such as bogs, fens, meadows, and salt marshes, and along the edges of ponds and lakes.

The sharp-pointed rush is a perennial plant that grows to a height of about 60 to 100 centimeters (24 to 39 inches). It has slender, cylindrical stems with narrow, pointed leaves and clusters of small, light brown flowers that bloom in the summer.

This species is important for a variety of reasons. It provides habitat and food for a range of wetland animals, including insects, birds, and mammals. It is also an important component of wetland ecosystems, helping to prevent soil erosion and maintain water quality. In some countries like Australia it is considered to be an invasive weed and the spines harmful to young children.

In addition, sharp-pointed rush has been used for a variety of purposes, including as a source of fiber for making paper, baskets, and other woven products, and for medicinal purposes. The plant has also been used for landscaping and erosion control, as well as for ornamental purposes in gardens and wildflower meadows.

== Synonyms ==
- Juncus acutus ssp. leopoldii (Parl.) Snog. -- Leopold's rush
- Juncus acutus L. var. sphaerocarpus Engelm
- Juncus acutus L. subsp. acutus
- Juncus spinosus Forssk
- Juncus acutus ssp. leopoldii also known as Leopold's rush is a native of Arizona, California, Georgia and Nevada.
- Juncus acutus L. var. conglobatus Trautv
- Juncus acutus L. var. decompositus Guss
- Juncus acutus L. var. longibracteatus Buchenau

== Description ==
Juncus acutus is a brown and green tussock-forming perennial that can grow to 1.5 metres (4.9 ft) tall in all kinds of soils, in areas which go from extremes in flood and dry like dunes or that just stay wet like lowland grassland and grassy woodland, riparian vegetation, freshwater wetland, and saline and subsaline wetlands.

Stems and leaves
Pith filled stems and leaves arise from the base at different angles giving the plant a globe shape. The leaves form a basal sheath around the flower stem leaves and end with a stiff sharp point.
Flowers
The flower stems are 2 millimetres (0.079 in) to 4 millimetres (0.16 in) in diameter and 4 centimetres (1.6 in) to 13 centimetres (5.1 in) long and are similar to the leaves. They emerge from the base at all angles and each have 1 - 6 flowers. Each flower has 6 stamens and 4 centimetres (1.6 in) to 25 centimetres (9.8 in) long bracts that terminate in a stiff and sharp point. The flowers are hermaphrodite and are pollinated by the wind.
Fruits and reproduction
Fruits are oval 3-celled brown capsules 4 millimetres (0.16 in) to 6 millimetres (0.24 in). The 1.2 millimetres (0.047 in) to 2 millimetres (0.079 in) long brown seeds have a tail at each end.
Roots
Short and robust rhizomes.

== Gallery ==
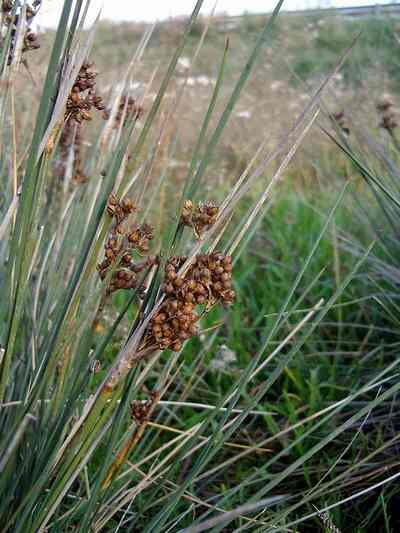
Habit

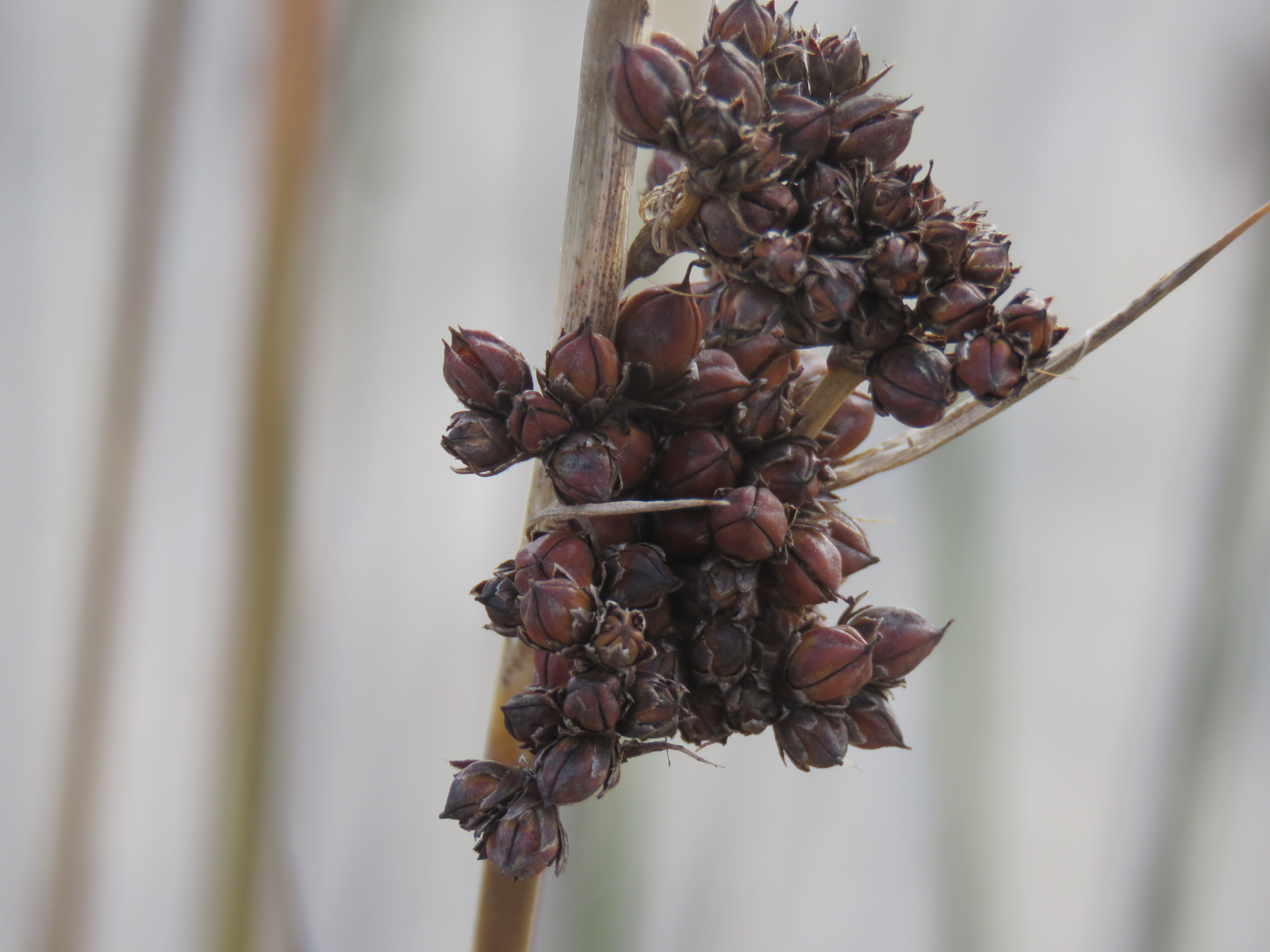
Inflorescence

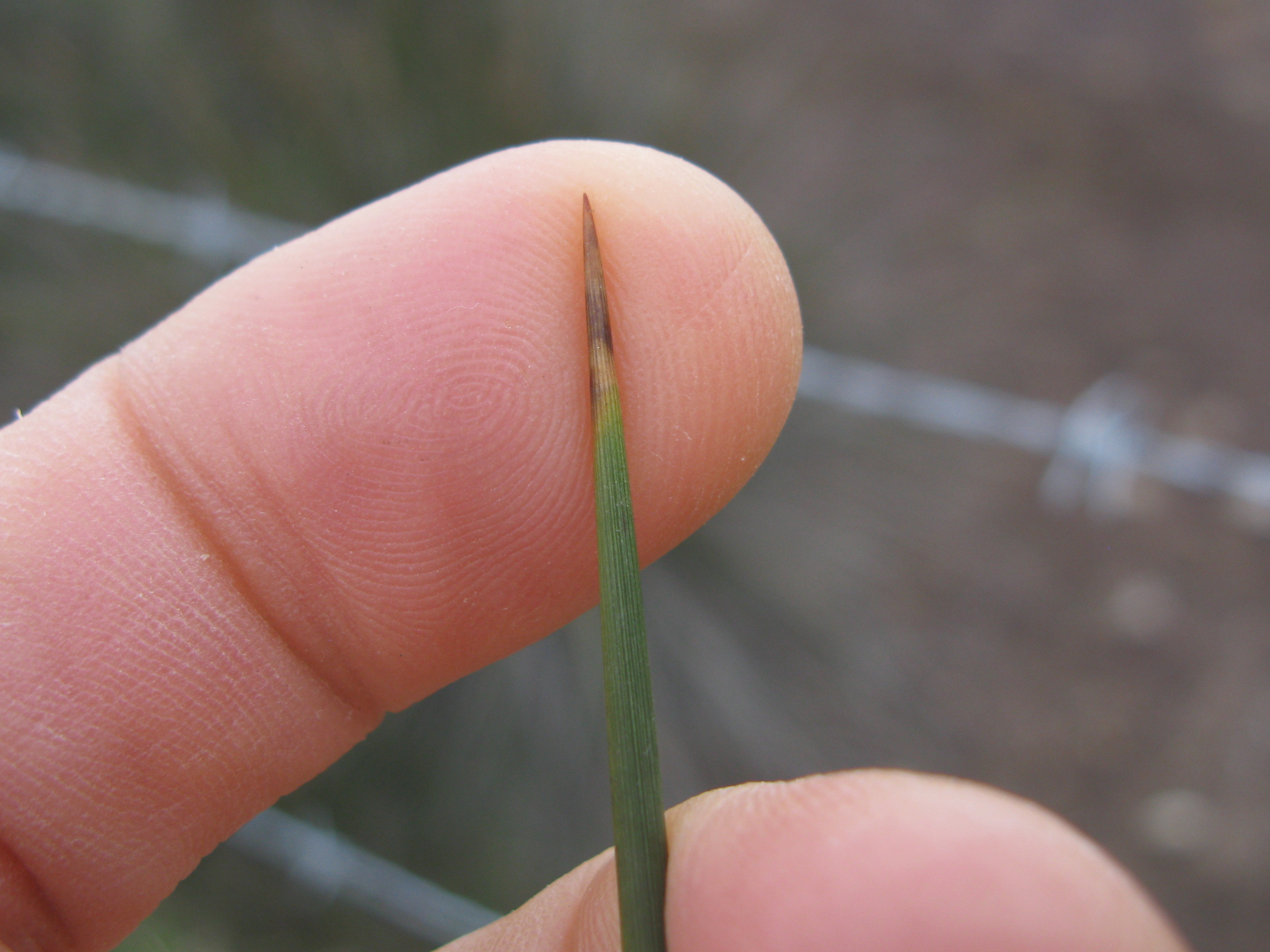
Sharp leaf tip of Juncus acutus

== Distribution ==
Found principally in low-lying damp, low fertility areas like sandy sea shores and dune slacks and coastal flats, occasionally in salt marshes and disturbed saline areas, mine dumps, lowland grassland and grassy woodland, riparian vegetation, freshwater wetland, and saline and subsaline wetlands

Palearctic:

Northern Africa: Algeria, Egypt, Morocco
Western Asia: Iran, Iraq, Israel, Jordan, Lebanon, Turkey
Caucasus: Armenia, Azerbaijan, Georgia
Northern Europe: British Isles
Southeastern Europe: Albania, Crete, Greece, Italy, Kosovo, Montenegro, Sardinia, Serbia, Sicily, Malta
Southwestern Europe: Azores, Balearic Islands, Corsica, France, Portugal, Spain

Nearctic:

Northern America: Baja California

== Community species ==
In Brazil, J. acutus has been observed on the Santa Catarina coast living in communities with:
- Ipomoea pes-caprae
- Hydrocotyle bonariensis
- Senecio crassiflorus
In a natural shallow depression in the Murray River floodplain in South Australia:
- Muehlenbeckia florulenta
- Atriplex semibaccata
- Halosarcia pergranulata ssp. pergranulata
- Mimulus repens
- Ludwigia peploides ssp. montevidensis
- Phragmites australis
- Paspalum vaginatum

== Chemistry ==
The dimeric phenanthrenoid 8,8'-bidehydrojuncusol and the monomeric juncusol and dehydrojuncusol can be isolated from J. acutus.
