= Cyperus haspan =

Conservation status
- Least Concern (IUCN 3.1)

Scientific classification
- Kingdom: Plantae
- Clade: Tracheophytes
- Clade: Angiosperms
- Clade: Monocots
- Clade: Commelinids
- Order: Poales
- Family: Cyperaceae
- Genus: Cyperus
- Species: C. haspan

Binomial name
- Cyperus haspan L.

Species of plant

Cyperus haspan is a dwarf papyrus sedge in the Cyperaceae. It is widely distributed in tropical and subtropical regions in Africa, Madagascar, southern Asia (Iran, India, China, Philippines, Indonesia, etc.), New Guinea, Australia, South America, West Indies, Central America, southern Mexico and the southeastern United States (from Texas to Virginia).

C. haspan is found most commonly in areas with full sunlight, as it has low tolerance for shaded areas. Common habitat types for this species includes low fields, tidal marshes, broadleaf marshes, and wet prairies. It has been found to have a tolerance for low-intensity fires.

== Description ==
The rhizomatous perennial grass-like sedge typically grows to a height of 0.2 to 0.6 metres (0.7 to 2.0 ft) and has a tufted habit. It blooms between Summer and Spring producing brown flowers.

In Western Australia it is found in wet areas in the Kimberley region where it grows in gravelly sandy-clay alluvium.

There are two recognised subspecies:

- Cyperus haspan L. subsp. haspan
- Cyperus haspan subsp. juncoides (Lam.) Kük.
