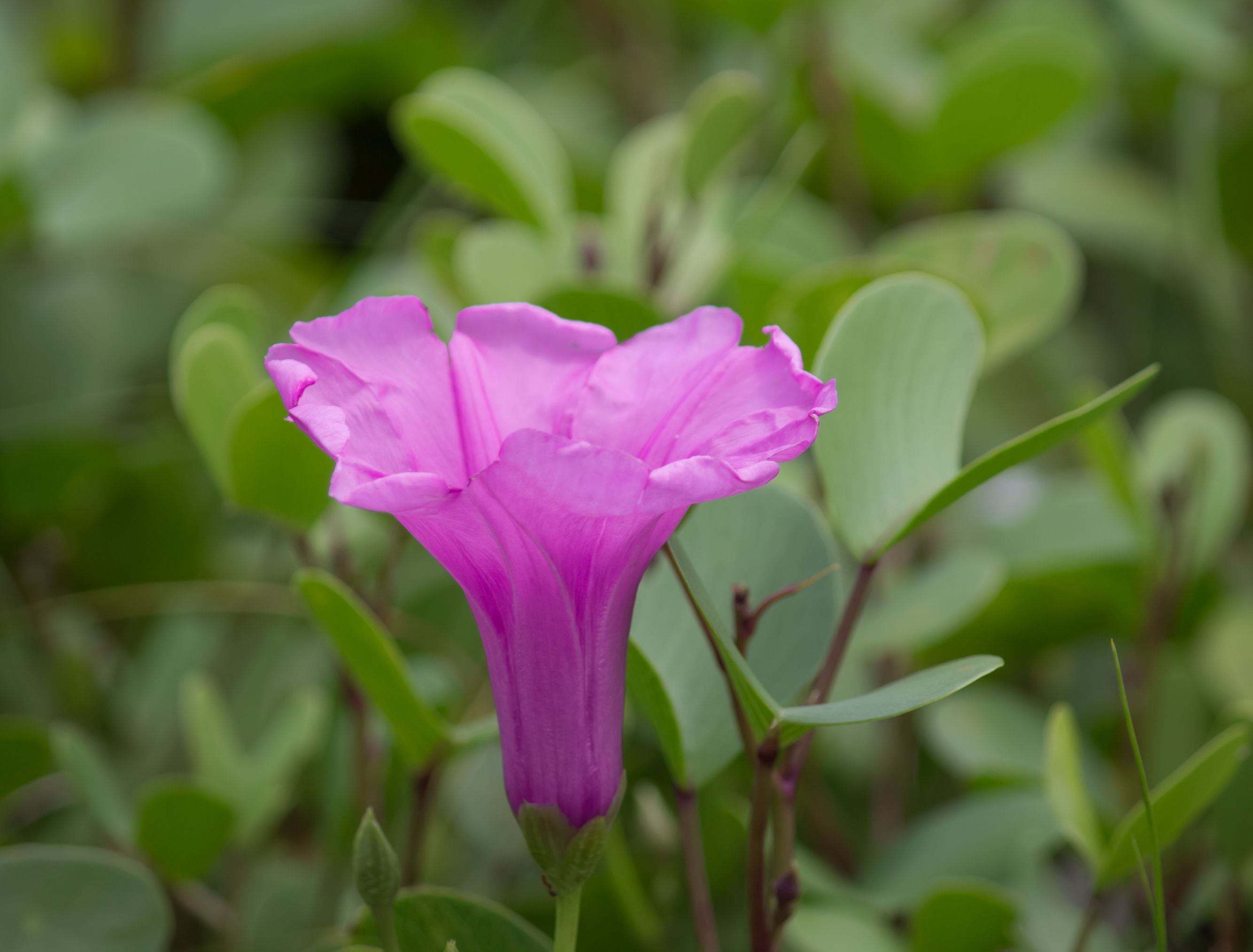
- Flower of Ipomoea pes-caprae at a Kerala beach

Conservation status
- Least Concern (IUCN 3.1)

- Secure (NatureServe)

Scientific classification
- Kingdom: Plantae
- Clade: Tracheophytes
- Clade: Angiosperms
- Clade: Eudicots
- Clade: Asterids
- Order: Solanales
- Family: Convolvulaceae
- Genus: Ipomoea
- Species: I. pes-caprae

Binomial name
- Ipomoea pes-caprae (L.) R.Br.

Synonyms
- Convolvulus pes-caprae L. Ipomoea biloba Forssk.

= Ipomoea pes-caprae =

Species of flowering plant

Ipomoea pes-caprae, also known as bayhops, bay-hops, beach morning glory, railroad vine, or goat's foot, is a common pantropical creeping vine belonging to the family Convolvulaceae. It grows on the upper parts of beaches and endures salted air. It is one of the most common and most widely distributed salt tolerant plants and provides one of the best known examples of oceanic dispersal. Its seeds float and are unaffected by salt water.

Originally described by Linnaeus, it was placed in its current genus by Robert Brown in 1818.

== Description ==
Ipomoea pes-caprae is a prostrate perennial, often covering large areas; stems long-trailing often several metres (rarely to thirty metres) in length, rooting at the nodes, glabrous. It has pink, fused petals with a darker centre. The fruit is a capsule containing 4 hairy seeds that float in water.

== Distribution ==
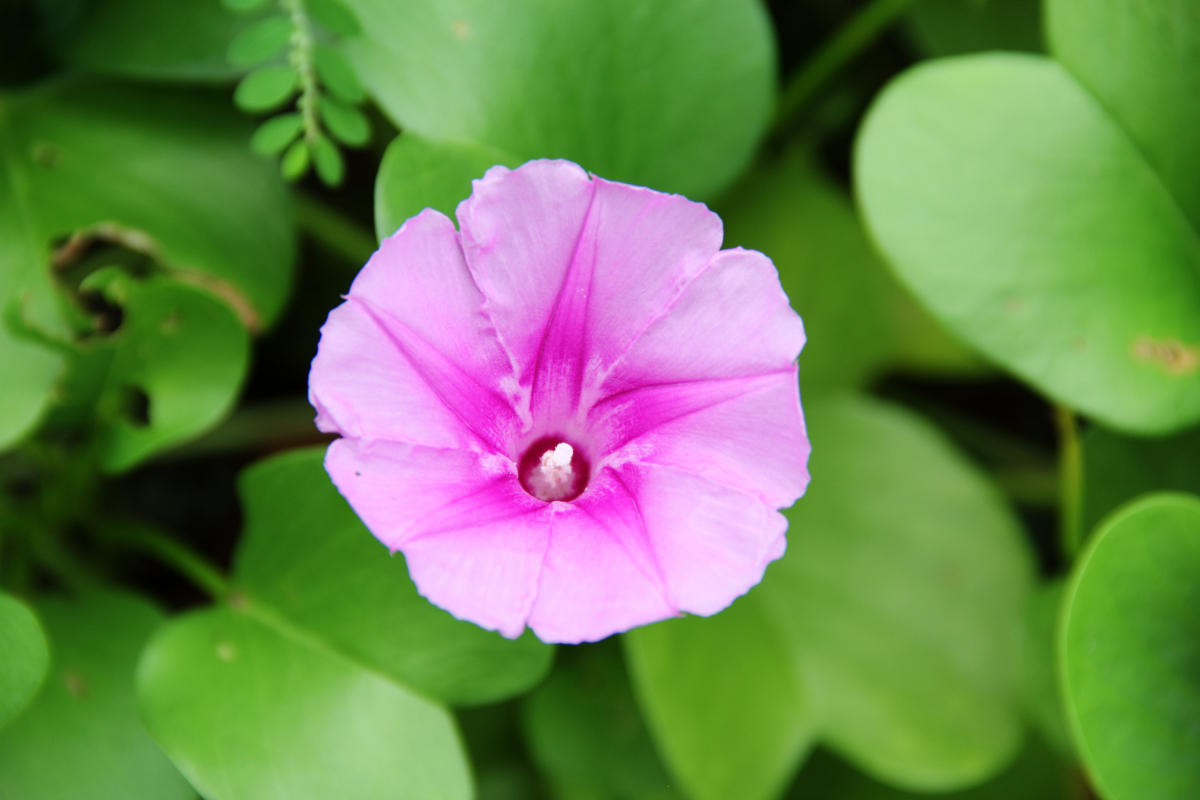
Ipomoea pes-caprae in China

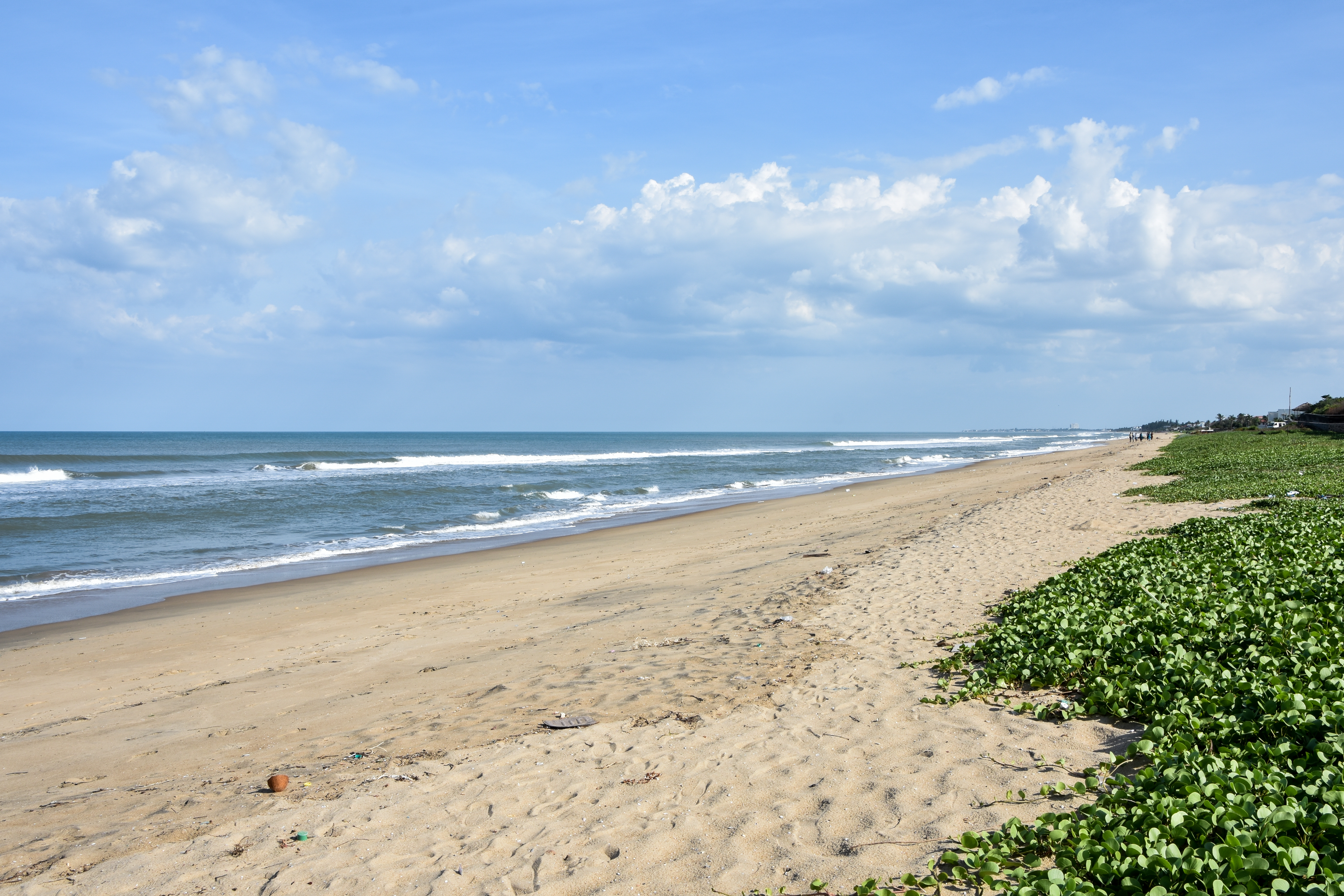
Stabilising the sands just above high tide mark, Uthandi Beach, Chennai

This species can be found on the sandy shores of the tropical Atlantic, Pacific, and Indian Oceans. A similar species, Ipomoea imperati, with white flowers, has an even wider distribution on the world's beaches. I. pes-caprae is common on the sand dunes of Australia's upper north coast of New South Wales, and can also be found along the entire Queensland coastline.

Goat's Foot is a primary sand stabilizer, being one of the first plants to colonise dunes. It grows on almost all parts of dunes but is usually found on the seaward slopes, sending long runners down towards the toe of the dune. The sprawling runners spread out from the woody rootstock, but the large two-lobed leaves are sparse and a dense cover on the sand is rarely achieved except in protected situations. This plant grows in association with sand Spinifex grass and is a useful sand binder, thriving under conditions of sandblast and salt spray.

Community species: Ipomoea pes-caprae has been observed in community situations, studied for their endurance of difficult growing conditions (on dunes) with some other tough species.

- Hydrocotyle bonariensis
- Senecio crassiflorus
- Juncus acutus

Together with Wollastonia biflora, Portulaca oleracea and Digitaria ciliaris, Ipomoea pes-caprae is usually one of the first species colonizing degraded or altered environments in tropical zones of the planet.

== Uses ==
In Australia, it is a commonly used aboriginal medicine used as poultice for sting ray and stone fish stings.

In Brazil, this plant – namely the subspecies brasiliensis – is known as salsa-da-praia in folk medicine, and is used to treat inflammation and gastrointestinal disorders.

In the Philippines, the plant is known locally as Bagasua and is used to treat rheumatism, colic, oedema, whitlow, and piles.

== Etymology ==
I. pes-caprae comes from the Latin 'pes' for foot and 'caprae' for goat and refers to the resemblance of the outline of the leaf to the footprint of a goat.

== Gallery ==
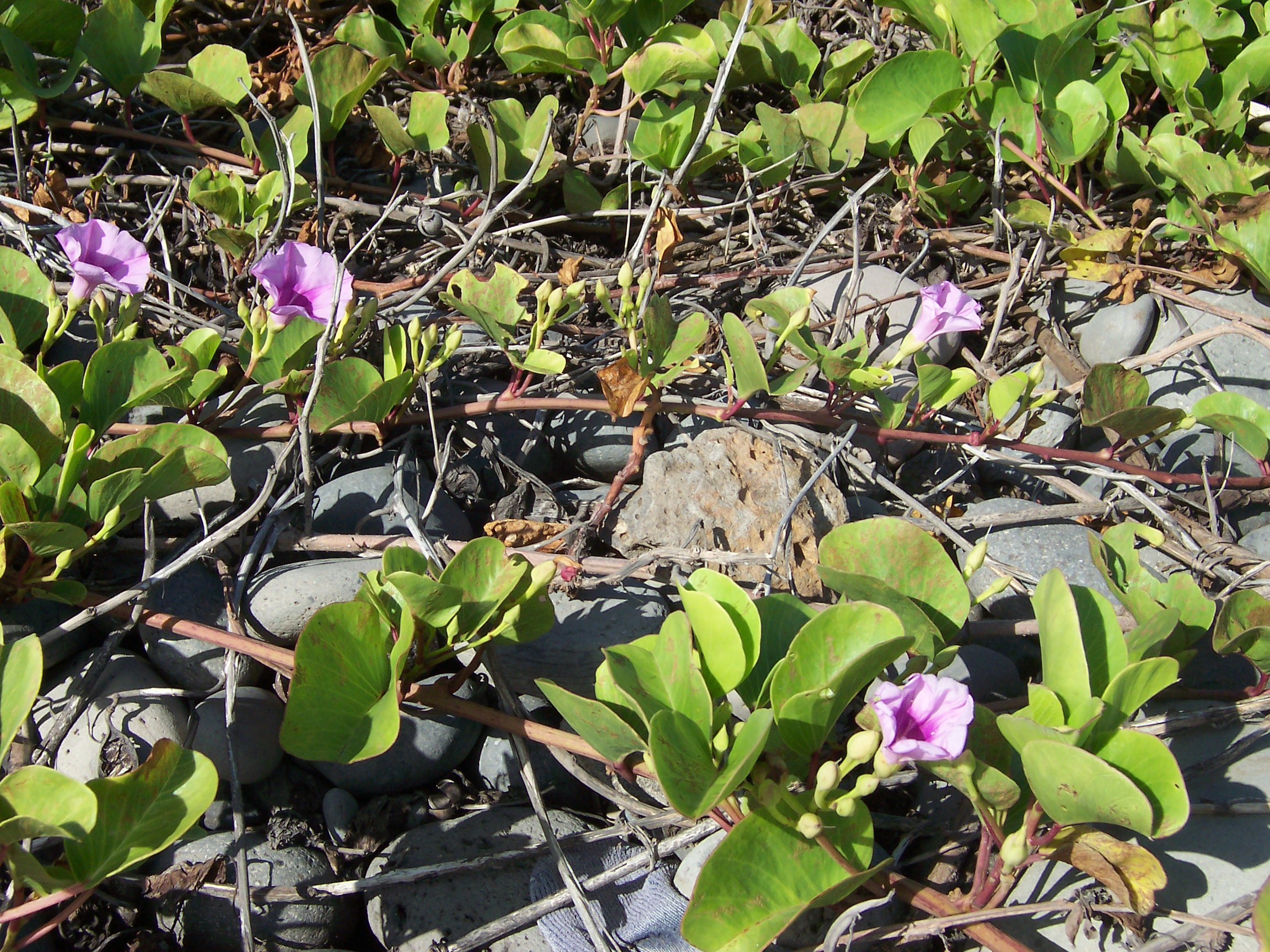
Vines on a pebble beach

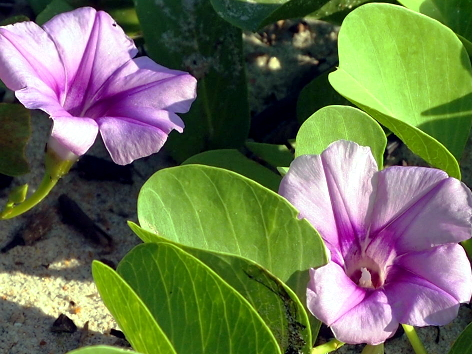
Beach morning glory in Malaysia

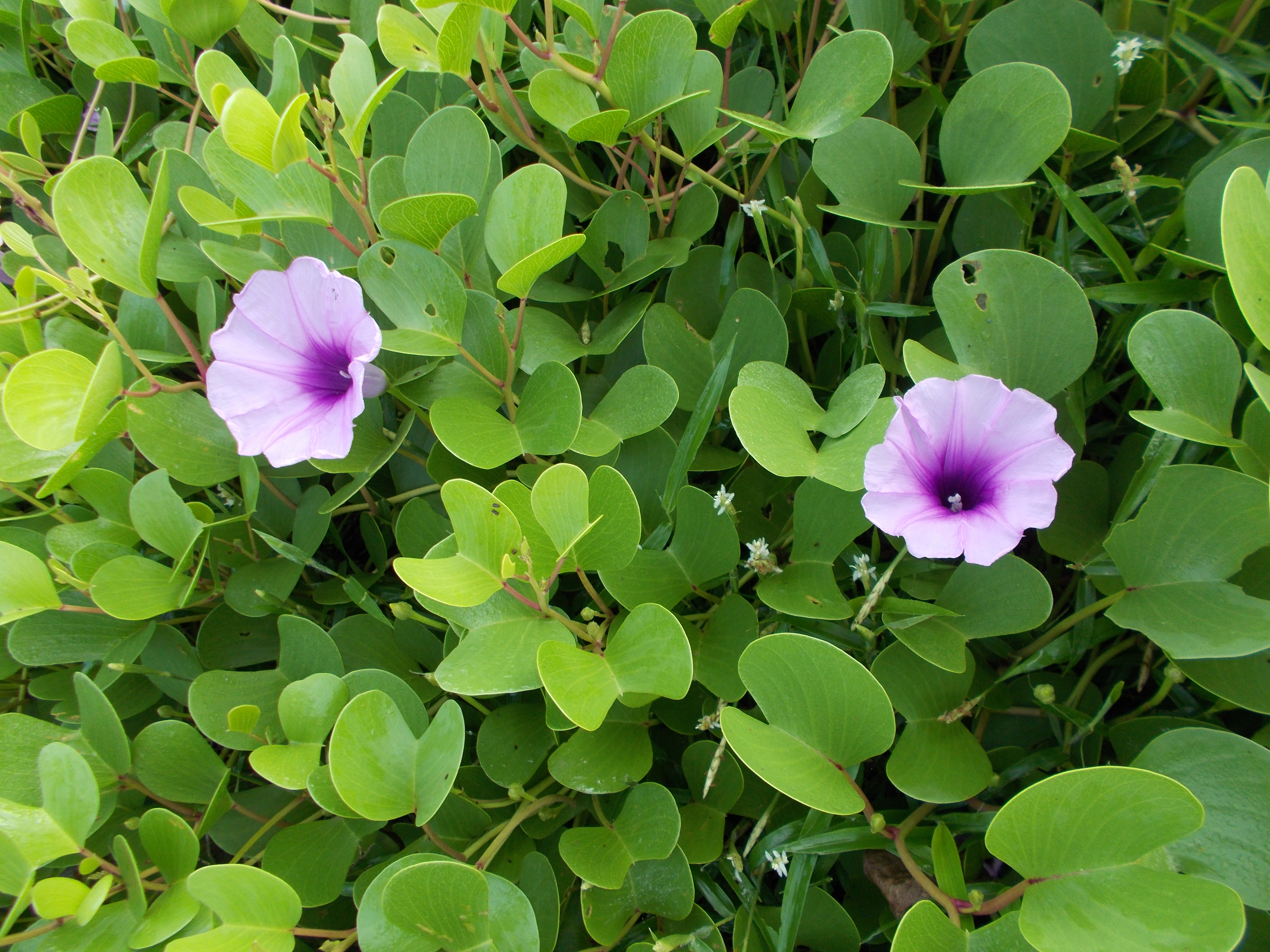
Beach morning glory, Muzhappilangad Beach

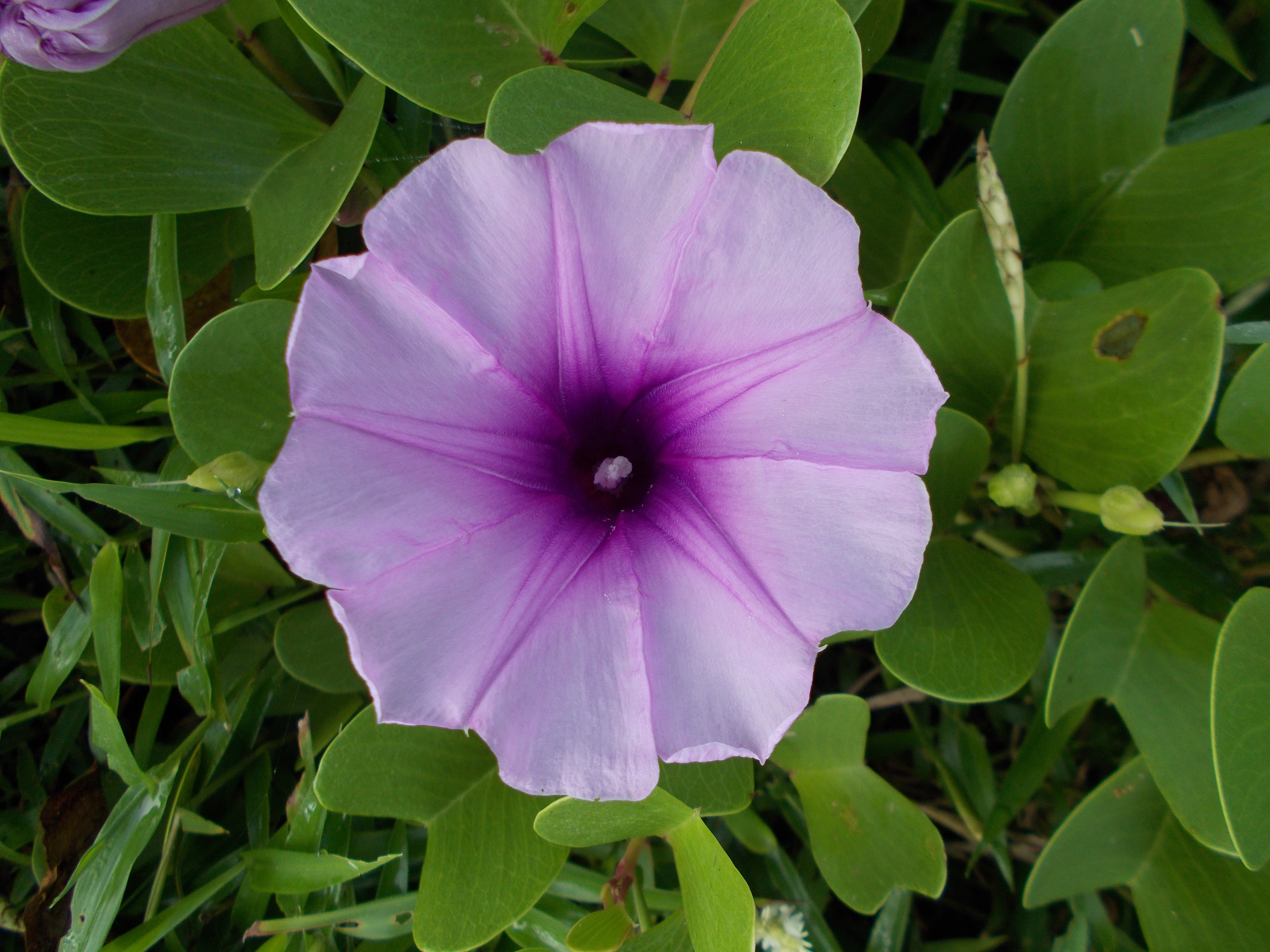
Beach morning glory, Muzhappilangad Beach

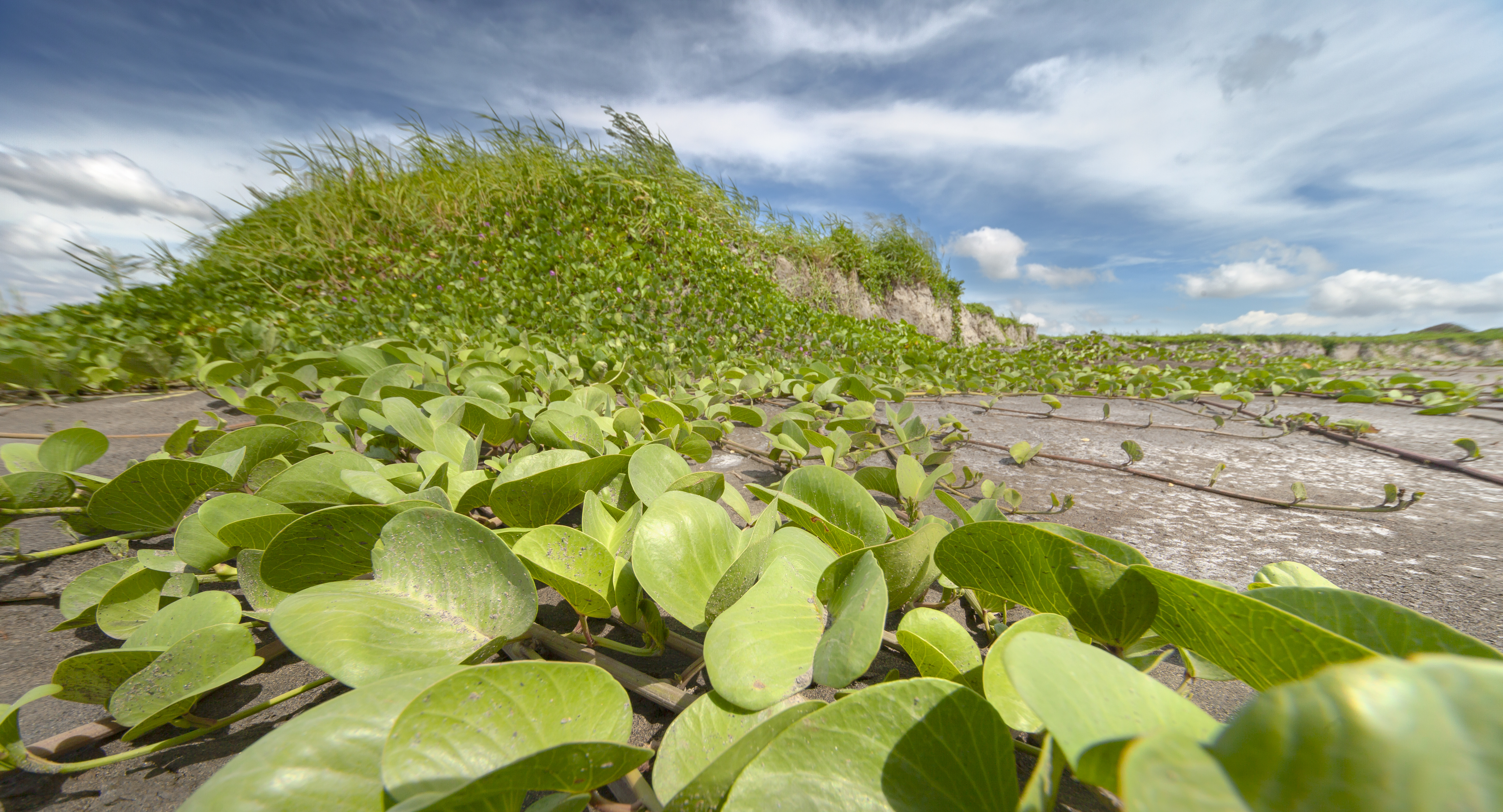
Beach morning glory vines, Yunlin

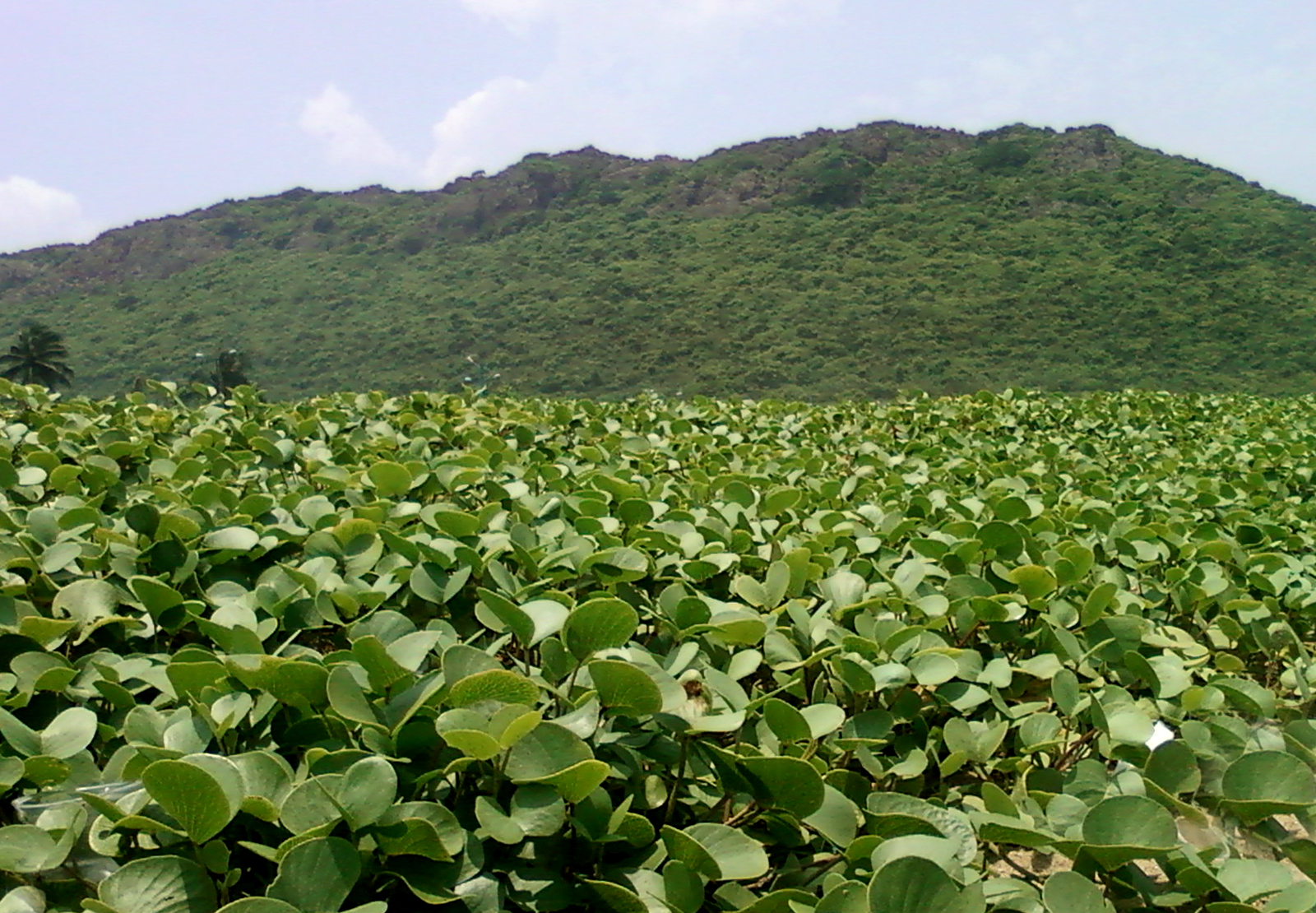
View of Eastern Ghats over beach morning glory bushes, Tenneti Park
