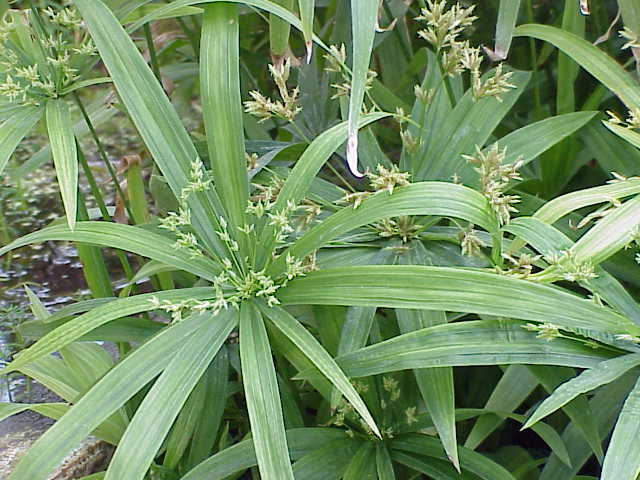
- Dwarf umbrella-sedge, Cyperus albostriatus

Scientific classification
- Kingdom: Plantae
- Clade: Tracheophytes
- Clade: Angiosperms
- Clade: Monocots
- Clade: Commelinids
- Order: Poales
- Family: Cyperaceae
- Genus: Cyperus; L.

Species
- About 700

Synonyms
- List: Acorellus Palla ex Kneuck.; Adupla Bosc ex Juss.; Aliniella J.Raynal, nom. illeg., non Skvortzow; Alinula J.Raynal; Androcoma Nees; Androtrichum (Brongn.) Brongn.; Anosporum Nees; Antrolepis Welw.; Ascolepis Nees; Ascopholis C.E.C.Fisch.; Atomostylis Steud.; Borabora Steud.; Chlorocyperus Rikli; Comostemum Nees; Courtoisina Soják; Crepidocarpus Klotzsch ex Boeckeler; Cylindrolepis Boeckeler; Cyprolepis Steud.; Diclidium Schrad. ex Nees; Didymia Phil.; Distimus Raf.; Duval-jouvea Palla; Epiphystis Trin.; Eucyperus Rikli; Galilea Parl.; Hedychloe Raf.; Hemicarpha Nees; Hydroschoenus Zoll. & Moritzi; Hypaelyptum Vahl; Indocourtoisia Bennet & Raizada; Juncellus C.B.Clarke; Killinga T.Lestib.; Kyllinga Rottb.; Kyllingiella R.W.Haines & Lye; Lipocarpha R.Br.; Lyprolepis Steud.; Mariscopsis Cherm.; Marisculus Goetgh; Mariscus Gaertn., nom. illeg., non Scop.; Mariscus Vahl, nom. cons.; Megarrhena Schrad. ex Nees; Opetiola Gaertn.; Oxycaryum Nees; Papyrus Willd.; Platylepis Kunth; Pseudomariscus Rauschert; Pterachne Schrad. ex Nees; Pterocyperus Opiz; Pterogyne Schrad. ex Nees; Pycreus P.Beauv.; Queenslandiella Domin; Raynalia Soják; Remirea Aubl.; Rikliella J.Raynal; Sorostachys Steud.; Sphaerocyperus Lye; Sphaeromariscus E.G.Camus; Thryocephalon J.R.Forst. & G.Forst.; Torreya Raf.; Torulinium Desv. ex Ham.; Trentepohlia Boeckeler; Ungeria Nees ex C.B.Clarke; Volkiella Merxm. & Czech

= Cyperus =

Cyperus Temporal range: Middle Miocene – Recent

Genus of plants

Cyperus is a large genus of about 700 species of sedges, distributed throughout all continents in both tropical and temperate regions.

The word comes from the ancient Greek κύπερος (kúperos), which meant one or several species of this genus. Common names include papyrus sedges, flatsedges, nutsedges, umbrella-sedges, galingales, and zozoro (from Malagasy).

== Description ==
They are annual or perennial plants, mostly aquatic and growing in still or slow-moving water up to 0.5 metres (20 in) deep. The species vary greatly in size, with small species only 5 centimetres (2 in) tall, while others can reach 5 metres (16 ft) in height. The stems are circular in cross-section in some, triangular in others, usually leafless for most of their length, with the slender grass-like leaves at the base of the plant, and in a whorl at the apex of the flowering stems. The flowers are greenish and wind-pollinated; they are produced in clusters among the apical leaves. The seed is a small nutlet.

== Ecology ==
Cyperus species are eaten by the larvae of some Lepidoptera species, including Chedra microstigma. They also provide an alternative food source for Bicyclus anynana larvae. The seeds and tubers are an important food for many small birds and mammals.

Cyperus microcristatus (from Cameroon) and C. multifolius (native to Panama and Ecuador) are possibly extinct; the former was only found once, in 1995, and the latter has not been seen in the last 200 years. The "true" papyrus sedge of Ancient Egypt, C. papyrus subsp. hadidii, is also very rare today due to draining of its wetland habitat; feared extinct in the mid-20th century, it is still found at a few sites in the Wadi El Natrun region and northern Sudan.

Some tuber-bearing species on the other hand, most significantly the purple nutsedge, C. rotundus, are considered invasive weeds in much of the world.

== Diversity ==
Around 700 species are currently recognised in the genus Cyperus.

== Fossil record ==
Many fossil fruits of a Cyperus species have been described from middle Miocene strata of the Fasterholt area near Silkeborg in Central Jutland, Denmark. Several fossil fruits of †Cyperus distachyoformis have been extracted from borehole samples of the Middle Miocene fresh water deposits in Nowy Sacz Basin, West Carpathians, Poland.

== Use by humans ==
Papyrus sedge (C. papyrus) of Africa was of major historical importance in providing papyrus. C. giganteus, locally known as cañita, is used by the Yokot'an Maya of Tabasco, Mexico, for weaving petates (sleeping mats) and sombreros. C. textilis and C. pangorei are traditionally used to produce the typical mats of Palakkad in India, and the makaloa mats of Niʻihau were made from C. laevigatus.

In Madagascar, material from cyperus (zozoro) is commonly used for making brooms and mats. Fabric woven from zozoro is often produced and traded by the Sihanaka with other peoples including the once-influential Merina. Pottery with zozoro motifs are common among Antsahabeans. There is a taboo (fady) surrounding one zozoro type C. aequalis as a sacred ancestral plant; in which the grass shall not be cut when the paddy grains yellow or else hail and rain will fail his own crop.

The chufa flatsedge (C. esculentus) has edible tubers and is grown commercially for these; they are eaten as vegetables, made into sweets, or used to produce the horchata in the Valencia region. Several other species – e.g. Australian bush onion (C. bulbosus) – are eaten to a smaller extent. For some Northern Paiutes, Cyperus tubers were a mainstay food, to the extent that they were known as tövusi-dökadö ("nutsedge tuber eaters")

Priprioca (C. articulatus) is one of the traditional spices of the Amazon region and its reddish essential oil is used commercially both by the cosmetic industry, and increasingly as a flavoring for food. Interest is increasing in the larger, fast-growing species as crops for paper and biofuel production.

Some species are grown as ornamental or pot plants, notably:

- Cyperus alternifolius syn. C. involucratus (umbrella papyrus)
- Cyperus albostriatus (dwarf umbrella sedge), formerly called C. diffusus)
- Cyperus haspan
- Cyperus longus
- Cyperus papyrus (papyrus)

Some Cyperus species are used in folk medicine. Roots of Near East species were a component of kyphi, a medical incense of Ancient Egypt. Tubers of C. rotundus (purple nut-sedge) tubers are used in kampō.

An unspecified Cyperus is mentioned as an abortifacient in the 11th-century poem De viribus herbarum.

== See also ==
- Amphoe Nong Prue, a district in Thailand. The name of its capital Nong Prue (หนองปรือ) literally means "Cyperus swamp".
- The sedge Carex pseudocyperus is a related plant convergent in appearance to Cyperus.
