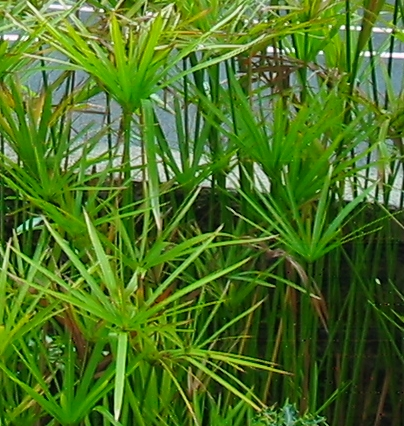

Scientific classification
- Kingdom: Plantae
- Clade: Tracheophytes
- Clade: Angiosperms
- Clade: Monocots
- Clade: Commelinids
- Order: Poales
- Family: Cyperaceae
- Genus: Cyperus
- Species: C. alternifolius

Binomial name
- Cyperus alternifolius Rottb., 1772

Synonyms
- Cyperus alternifolius Baker; Cyperus alternifolius var. albovariegatus auct.; Cyperus alternifolius var. obtusangulum (Boeckeler) T.Koyama; Cyperus alternifolius var. petersianus (Boeckeler) Kük.; Cyperus flagellatus Hochst.; Cyperus gradatus Forssk.; Cyperus involucratus Rottb.; Cyperus petersianus Boeckeler; Cyperus proximus Steud.

= Cyperus alternifolius =

Species of plant native to Africa

Cyperus alternifolius, the umbrella papyrus, umbrella sedge or umbrella palm, is a grass-like plant in the large genus Cyperus of the sedge family Cyperaceae. The plant is native to West Africa, Madagascar and the Arabian Peninsula, but widely distributed throughout the world. It has gained the Royal Horticultural Society's Award of Garden Merit. The subspecies Cyperus alternifolius ssp. flabelliformis is also known as Cyperus involucratus Rottb..

== Cultivation ==
Cyperus alternifolius is frequently cultivated as an ornamental plant worldwide. It is planted in gardens in the ground, pots, in ponds, and as a houseplant. It is not hardy, and requires protection when temperatures fall below 5 °C (41 °F) (USDA Zones: 9a–11b). It is propagated by dividing the roots or cutting off a top and placing it upside down in a glass of water. It requires copious moisture and can grow in a few inches of water. The cultivar Cyperus alternifolius 'Variegatus' is grown for its variegated foliage and smaller size.

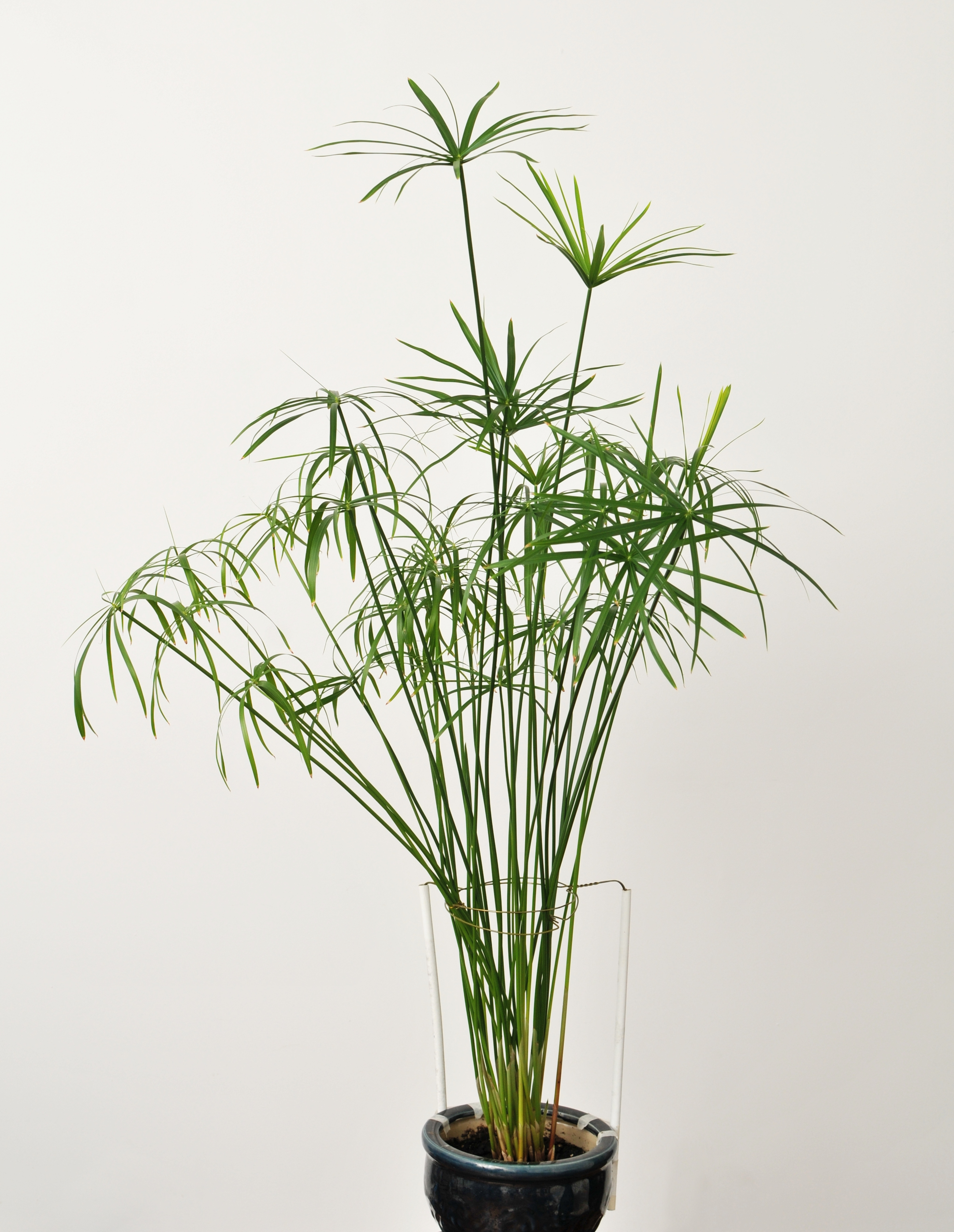

== See also ==
- List of Cyperus species
