= List of Commelinaceae genera =

This is a list of Commelinaceae genera as of 2025. This list includes all genera recognised as current by the Kew's Plants of the World Online.

== Genera list ==
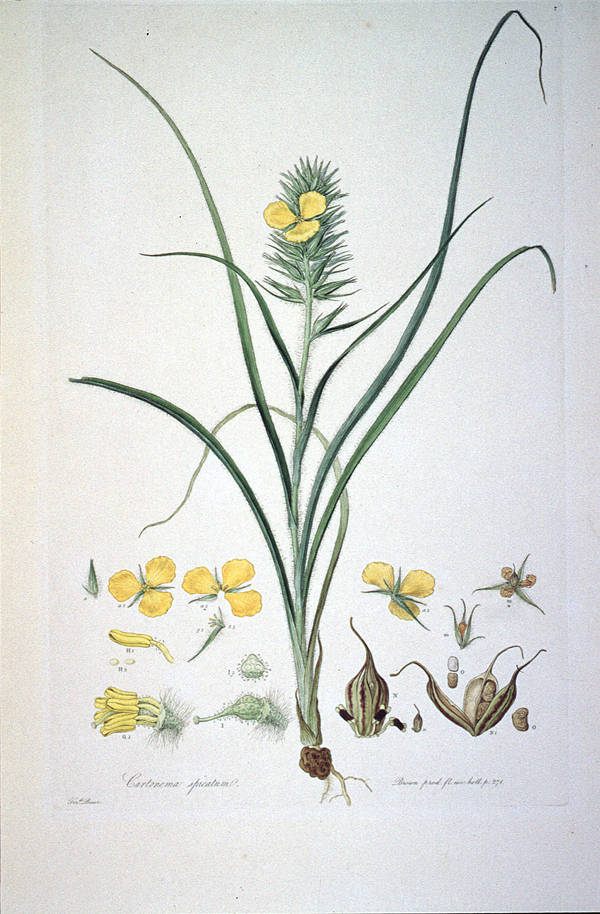
Cartonema spicatum, as illustrated in Robert Brown's Prodromus Florae Novae Hollandiae et Insulae Van Diemen

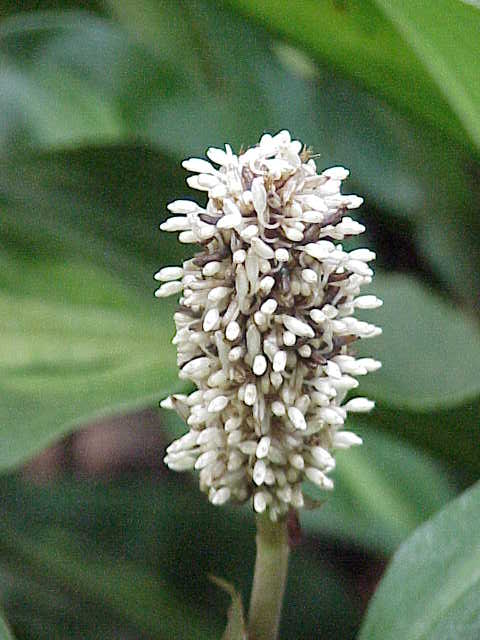
Inflorescence of Palisota pynaertii

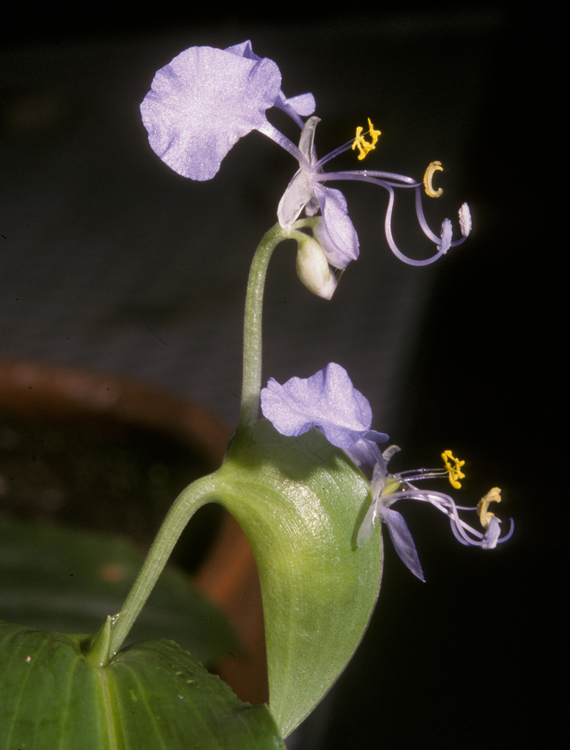
Commelina lukei

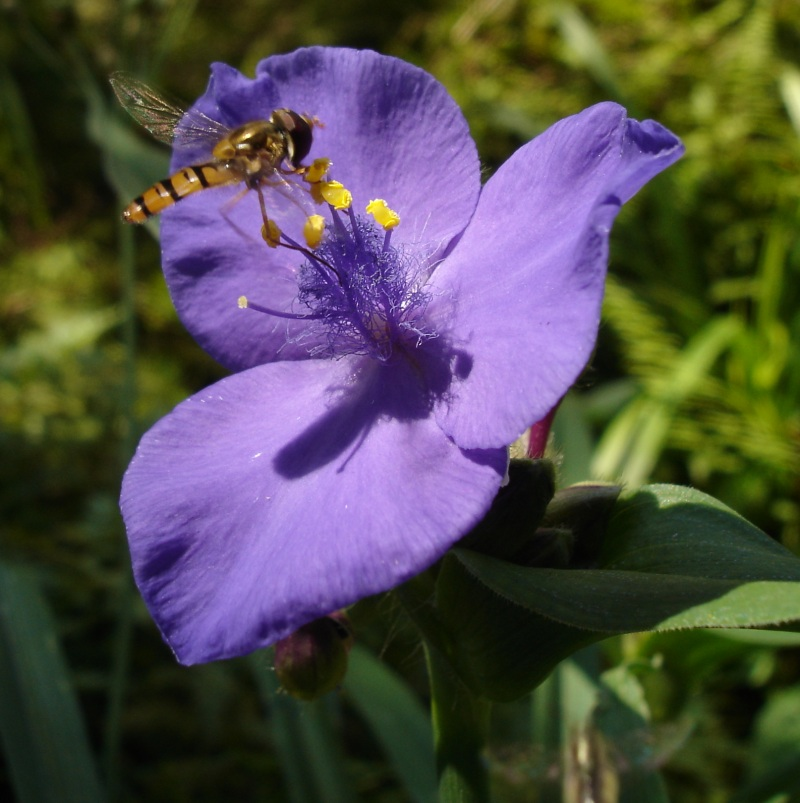
A species of Tradescantia being visited by a fly.

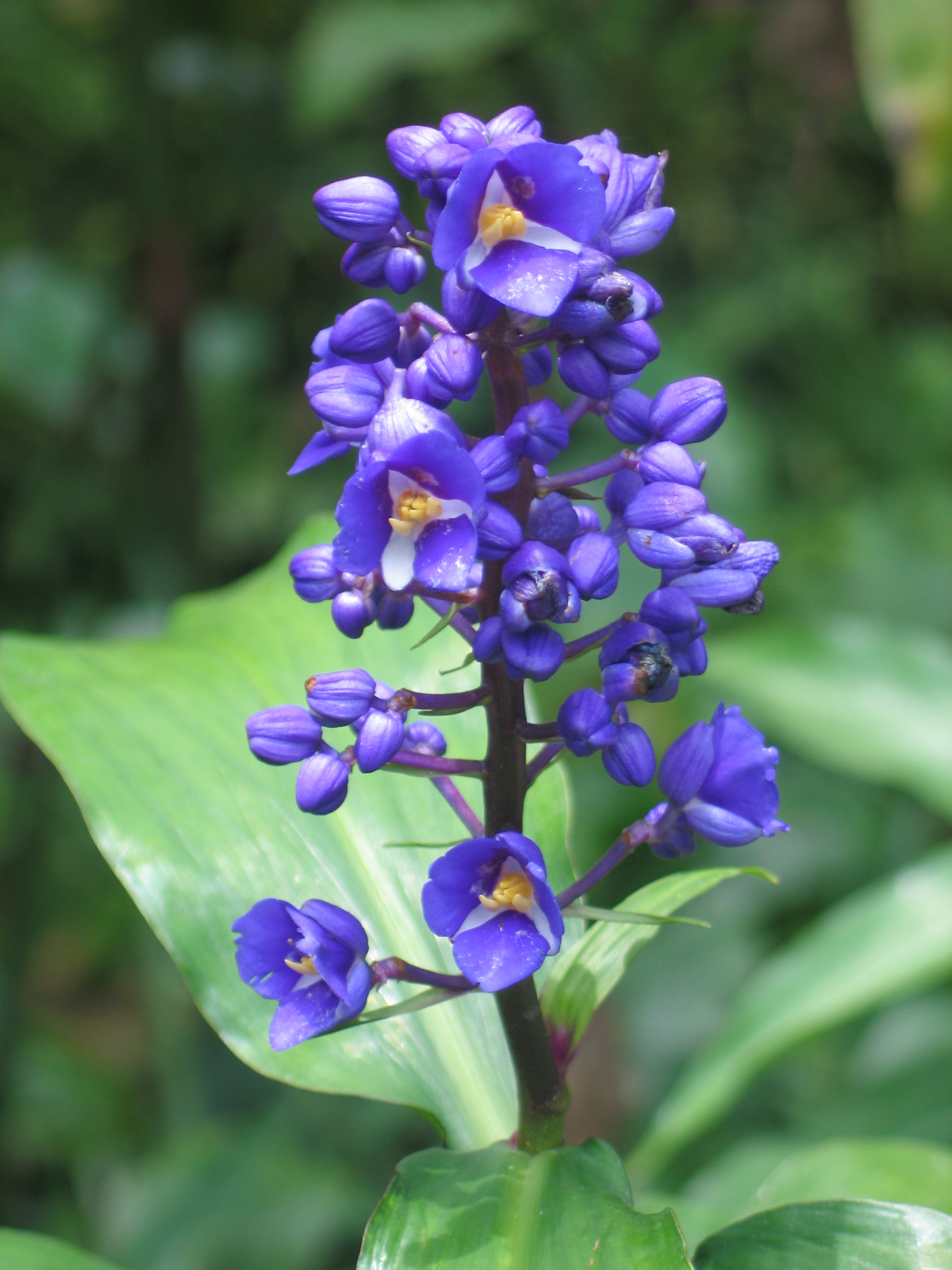
Dichorisandra thyrsiflora, the type species of Dichorisandra

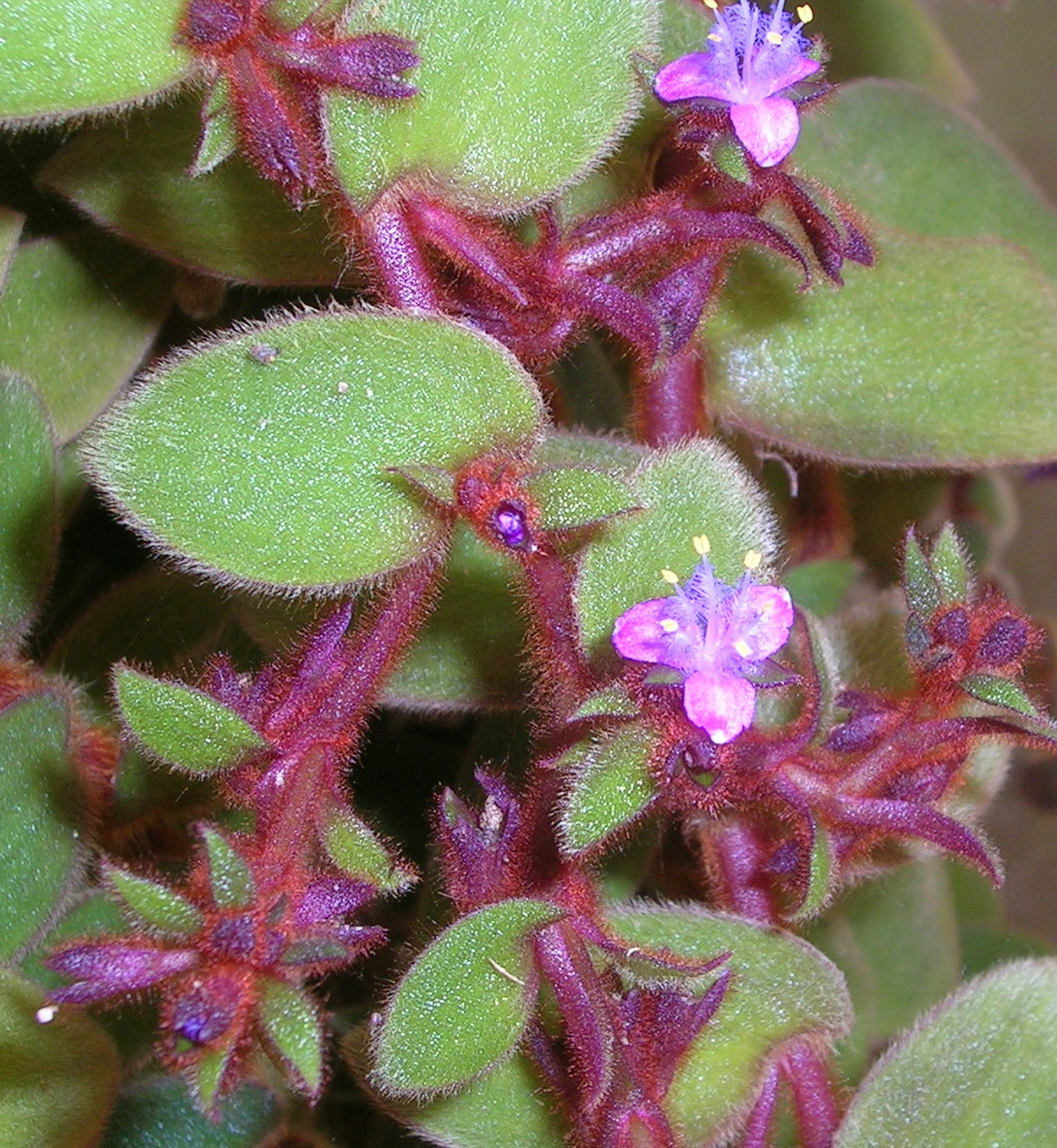
Cyanotis beddomei in cultivation

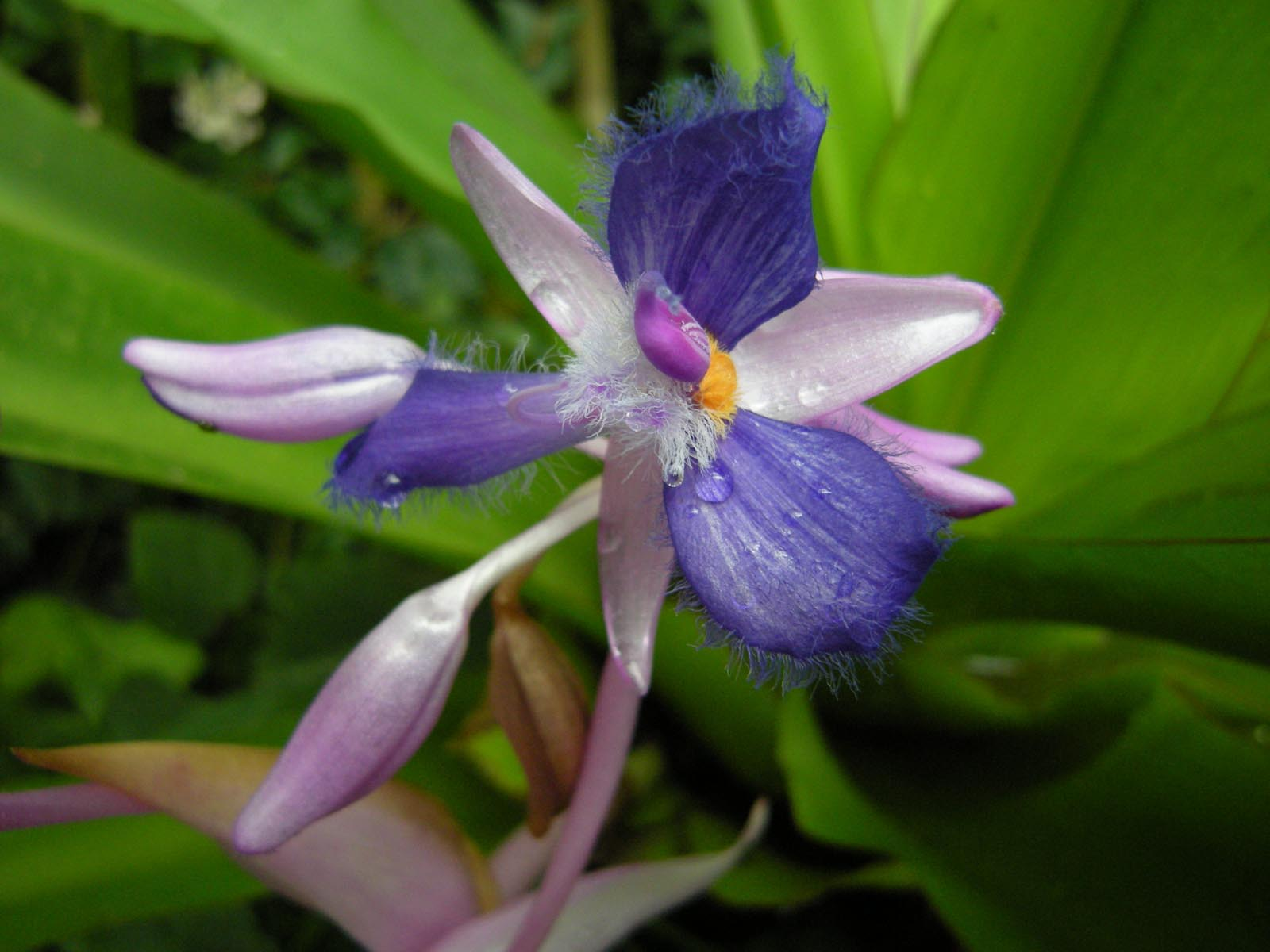
Cochliostema jacobianum

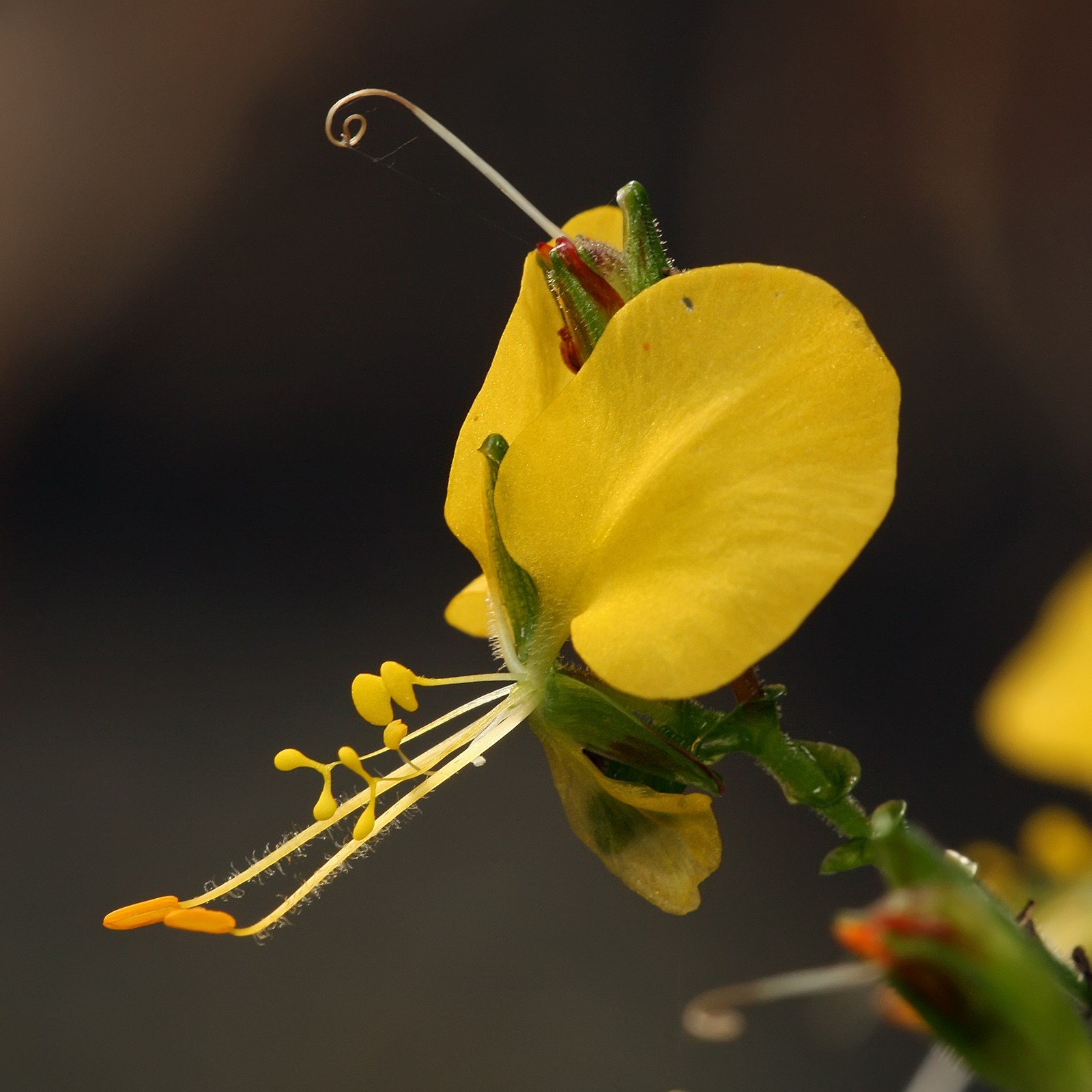
Aneilema aequinoctiale from Tanzania

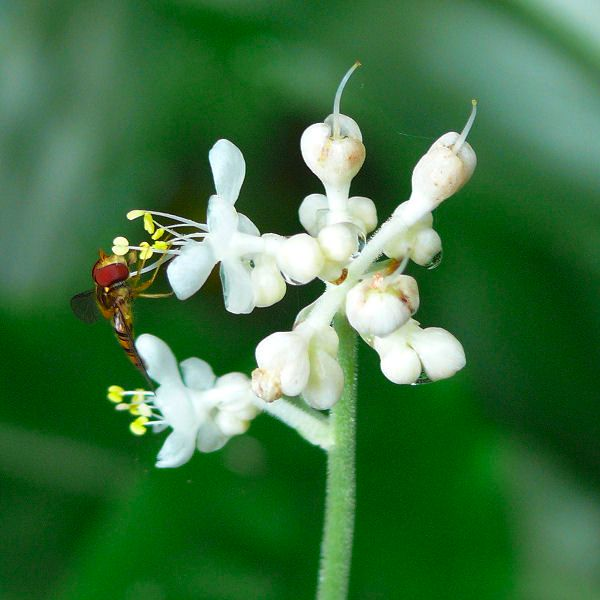
Pollia japonica with the syrphid fly Episyrphus balteatus

Genus Authority	Year	Classification	Type species	# of species	Distribution
Cartonema; R.Br.	1810	Cartonematoideae; Cartonemateae	Cartonema spicatum R.Br.	7	Australia
Triceratella; Brenan	1961	Cartonematoideae; Triceratelleae	Triceratella drummondii Brenan	1	Zimbabwe & Mozambique
Palisota; Rchb. ex Endlicher	1836	Commelinoideae; Tradescantieae; Palisotineae	Palisota ambigua (P.Beauv.) C.B.Clarke	31	Africa
Streptolirion; Edgew. (Note: "June 3". Proceedings of the Linnean Society of London. 1 (26): 252–254. 1845. doi:10.1111/j.1095-8312.1845.tb01000-26.x. (Paper summary) (Note: The paper itself was published as Edgeworth, M. Pakenham (1846). "Descriptions of some unpublished Species of Plants from North-Western India". Transactions of the Linnean Society of London. 20 (1): 23–91. doi:10.1111/j.1096-3642.1846.tb00410.x.))	1845	Commelinoideae; Tradescantieae; Streptoliriineae	Streptolirion volubile Edgew.	2	Himalayas to Japan
Spatholirion; Ridl.	1896	Commelinoideae; Tradescantieae; Streptoliriineae	Spatholirion ornatum Ridl.	7	China to Malaysia
Aetheolirion; Forman	1962	Commelinoideae; Tradescantieae; Streptoliriineae	Aetheolirion stenolobium Forman	1	Thailand
Cyanotis; D.Don	1825	Commelinoideae; Tradescantieae; Cyanotinae	Cyanotis barbata D.Don	51	Paleotropics
Coleotrype; C.B.Clarke	1881	Commelinoideae; Tradescantieae; Coleotrypineae	Coleotrype natalensis C.B.Clarke	10	Africa, Madagascar
Amischotolype; Hassk.	1863	Commelinoideae; Tradescantieae; Coleotrypineae	Amischotolype glabrata (Note: The correct name for this species is Amischotolype mollissima (Blume) Hassk.); Hassk.	28	Central Africa, India to New Guinea
Siderasis; Raf.	1837 ("1836")	Commelinoideae; Tradescantieae; Dichorisandrinae	Siderasis acaulis (Note: This name is illegitimate; the correct name is Siderasis fuscata (Lodd.) H.E.Moore.); Raf.	6	Eastern Brazil
Dichorisandra; J.C.Mikan	1820	Commelinoideae; Tradescantieae; Dichorisandrinae	Dichorisandra thyrsiflora J.C.Mikan	57	Neotropics
Cochliostema; Lem.	1859	Commelinoideae; Tradescantieae; Dichorisandrinae	Cochliostema odoratissimum Lem.	2	Nicaragua to Ecuador
Geogenanthus (Note: This name was proposed as a replacement for Ule's own Chamaeanthus (Verh. Bot. Vereins Prov. Brandenburg 50:71, 1909, "1908"), which was predated by Chamaeanthus J.J.Sm. (Orch. Jav.:552, 1905), but the replacement Uleopsis had been published by Friedrich Karl Georg Fedde in the meantime (Just's Bot. Jahresber. 37(2):77, 1911, "1909" ). The correct name is Uleopsis, but is not in current use.); Ule	1913	Commelinoideae; Tradescantieae; Dichorisandrinae	Geogenanthus wittianus (Note: The currently used name for this species is Geogenanthus poeppigii (Miq.) Faden; the correct, but yet unpublished combination would be Uleopsis poeppigii.) (Ule) Ule	3	Western South America
Plowmanianthus; Faden & C.R.Hardy	2004	Commelinoideae; Tradescantieae; Dichorisandrinae	Plowmanianthus perforans Faden & C.R.Hardy	5	Panama to Amazonian Bassin
Tinantia; Scheidw.	1839	Commelinoideae; Tradescantieae; Thyrsanthemineae	Tinantia fugax (Note: A synonym of Tinantia erecta (Jacq.) Fenzl.); Scheidw.	13	Texas to Neotropics
Thyrsanthemum; Pichon	1946	Commelinoideae; Tradescantieae; Thyrsanthemineae	Thyrsanthemum floribundum (M.Martens & Galeotti) Pichon	4	Mexico
Weldenia; Schult.f.	1829	Commelinoideae; Tradescantieae; Thyrsanthemineae	Weldenia candida Schult.f.	2	Mexico and Guatemala
Matudanthus; D.R.Hunt	1978	Commelinoideae; Tradescantieae; Thyrsanthemineae	Matudanthus nanus (M.Martens & Galeotti) D.R.Hunt	1	Mexico
Sauvallia; C.Wright ex Hassk.	1870	Commelinoideae; Tradescantieae; Thyrsanthemineae	Sauvallea blainii C.Wright	1	Cuba
Elasis; D.R.Hunt	1978	Commelinoideae; Tradescantieae; Tradescantiinae	Elasis hirsuta (Kunth) D.R.Hunt	2	Ecuador
Gibasis; Raf.	1839	Commelinoideae; Tradescantieae; Tradescantiinae	Gibasis pulchella (Kunth)Raf.	14	Neotropics
Tradescantia; L.	1753	Commelinoideae; Tradescantieae; Tradescantiinae	Tradescantia virginiana L.	86	New World
Callisia; Loefl.	1758	Commelinoideae; Tradescantieae; Tradescantiinae	Callisia repens (Jacq.) L.	19	Tropical and subtropical Americas
Tripogandra; Raf.	1837	Commelinoideae; Tradescantieae; Tradescantiinae	Tripogandra multiflora (Sw.) Raf.	22	Neotropics
Stanfieldiella; Brenan	1960	Commelinoideae; Commelineae	Stanfieldiella imperforata (C.B.Clarke) Brenan	4	Africa
Floscopa; Lour.	1790	Commelinoideae; Commelineae	Floscopa scandens Lour.	21	Pantropical
Buforrestia; C.B.Clarke	1881	Commelinoideae; Commelineae	Buforrestia mannii C.B.Clarke	3	West and Central Africa and northern South America
Murdannia; Royle	1840 ("1839")	Commelinoideae; Commelineae	Murdannia scapiflora (Note: This species is currently treated as a synonym of Murdannia edulis (Stokes) Faden.) (Roxb.) Royle	61	Pantropcal
Tricarpelema; J.K.Morton	1966	Commelinoideae; Commelineae	Tricarpelema thomsonii (Note: Now a synonym of Tricarpelema giganteum (Hassk.) H.Hara.) (C.B.Clarke) J.K.Morton	8	India to Southeast Asia
Pseudoparis; H.Perrier	1936	Commelinoideae; Commelineae	Pseudoparis cauliflora H.Perrier	2 or 3	Madagascar
Polyspatha; Benth.	1849	Commelinoideae; Commelineae	Polyspatha paniculata Benth.	3	Tropical Africa
Dictyospermum; Wight	1853	Commelinoideae; Commelineae	Dictyospermum montanum Wight	5	India and Sri Lanka to New Guinea
Pollia; Thunb.	1781	Commelinoideae; Commelineae	Pollia japonica Thunb.	19	Pantropical
Aneilema; R.Br.	1810	Commelinoideae; Commelineae	Aneilema biflorum R.Br.	66	Pantropical
Rhopalephora; Hassk.	1864	Commelinoideae; Commelineae	Rhopalephora blumei (Note: This species' correct name is Rhopalephora micrantha (Vahl) Faden.); Hassk.	4	Madagascar, India to Fiji
Commelina; L.	1753	Commelinoideae; Commelineae	Commelina communis L.	208	Cosmopolitan
Tapheocarpa; Conran	1994	Commelinoideae; Commelineae	Tapheocarpa calandrinioides (F.Muell.) Conran	1	Australia
