= Sauvallia =

Scientific classification
- Kingdom: Plantae
- Clade: Tracheophytes
- Clade: Angiosperms
- Clade: Monocots
- Clade: Commelinids
- Order: Commelinales
- Family: Commelinaceae
- Subfamily: Commelinoideae
- Tribe: Tradescantieae
- Subtribe: Thyrsanthemineae
- Genus: Sauvallia; C.Wright ex Hassk.
- Species: S. blainii

Binomial name
- Sauvallia blainii C.Wright ex Hassk.

Synonyms
- Commelina blainii (C.Wright) Woodson; Sauvallea blainii C.Wright

Genus of plants

Sauvallia is a monotypic genus of monocotyledonous flowering plants in the family Commelinaceae, first described as a genus in 1871. The genus consists of a single species, Sauvallia blainii, which was endemic to Cuba.

The species is believed to be extinct.

The genus name of Sauvallia is in honour of Francisco Adolfo Sauvalle (1807–1879), Cuban botanist and expert in molluscs. It is not known what the Latin specific epithet of blainii refers to.

It was first described and published in Commelin. Ind.: 61 in 1870. Plants of the World Online note that Sauvallea C.Wright, is a synonym of Sauvallia C.Wright ex Hassk.

It was placed within subtribe Thyrsanthemineae, due to its solitary spathe inclosing a single flower. It also has six, equal, filaments bearded (as part of the stamen) and subequal petals. Specimens exist at the Missouri Dunn-Palmer Herbarium.
