= Forrestia =

Forrestia can refer to one of these plant genera:

- Forrestia Raf., synonym of the genus Ceanothus L.
- Forrestia A.Rich., synonym of the genus Amischotolype Hassk.
