= Pseudoparis =

Scientific classification
- Kingdom: Plantae
- Clade: Tracheophytes
- Clade: Angiosperms
- Clade: Monocots
- Clade: Commelinids
- Order: Commelinales
- Family: Commelinaceae
- Subfamily: Commelinoideae
- Tribe: Commelineae
- Genus: Pseudoparis; H.Perrier

Type species
- Pseudoparis cauliflora H.Perrier

Genus of plants

Pseudoparis is a genus of perennial monocotyledonous flowering plants in the family Commelinaceae, first described in 1936. The genus contains three known species, all endemic to Madagascar.

Species

- Pseudoparis cauliflora H.Perrier 1936
- Pseudoparis monandra H.Perrier 1936
- Pseudoparis tenera (Baker) Faden 1991
