= Floscopa mannii =

Conservation status
- Endangered (IUCN 3.1)

Scientific classification
- Kingdom: Plantae
- Clade: Tracheophytes
- Clade: Angiosperms
- Clade: Monocots
- Clade: Commelinids
- Order: Commelinales
- Family: Commelinaceae
- Genus: Floscopa
- Species: F. mannii

Binomial name
- Floscopa mannii C.B.Clarke

Species of flowering plant

Floscopa mannii is a species of plant in the family Commelinaceae. It is native to Cameroon and Nigeria. It grows in swampy forest habitat. It is known from very few collections.
