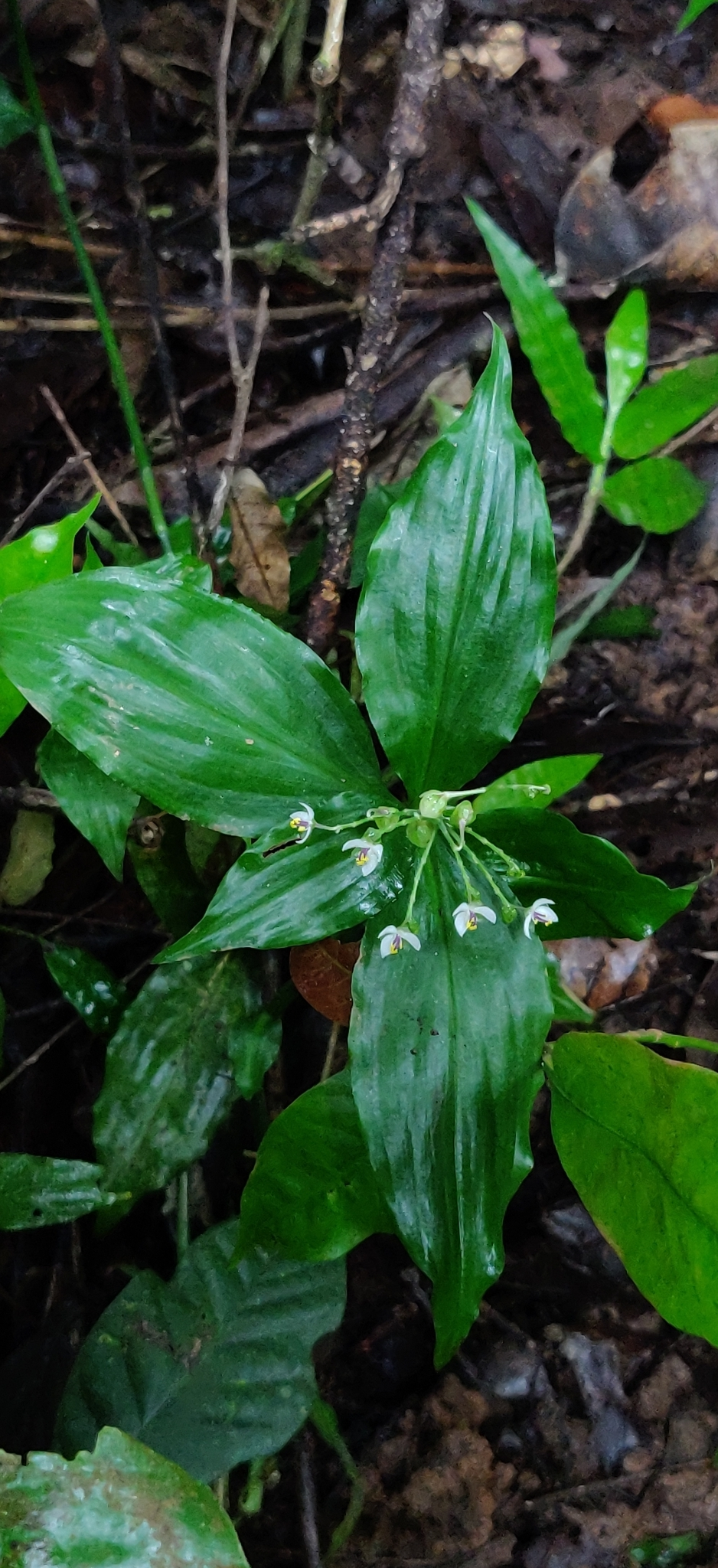
- Dictyospermum ovalifolium

Scientific classification
- Kingdom: Plantae
- Clade: Tracheophytes
- Clade: Angiosperms
- Clade: Monocots
- Clade: Commelinids
- Order: Commelinales
- Family: Commelinaceae
- Subfamily: Commelinoideae
- Tribe: Commelineae
- Genus: Dictyospermum; Wight.

Type species
- Dictyospermum montanum Wight.

= Dictyospermum =

Genus of flowering plants

Dictyospermum is a genus of monocotyledonous flowering plants in the family Commelinaceae, first described in 1853. It is native to Tropical Asia. They have only three fertile stamens, middle one inserted opposite petal.

Species

- Dictyospermum conspicuum (Blume) Hassk. - from Southern China to Southeast Asia
- Dictyospermum humile Faden - New Guinea
- Dictyospermum montanum Benth. - India + Sri Lanka
- Dictyospermum ovalifolium Benth. - India
- Dictyospermum ovatum Benth. - from India to Southeast Asia
