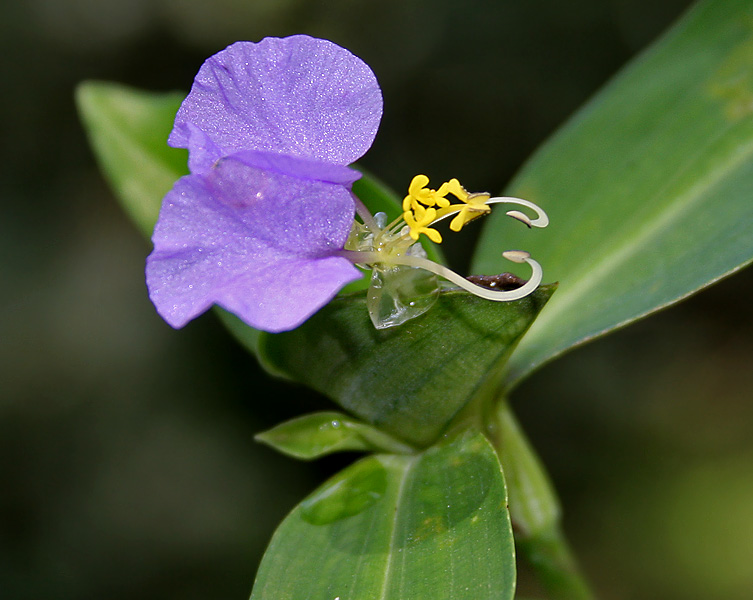
- Commelina maculata in Narsapur, Medak district, India.

Scientific classification
- Kingdom: Plantae
- Clade: Tracheophytes
- Clade: Angiosperms
- Clade: Monocots
- Clade: Commelinids
- Order: Commelinales
- Family: Commelinaceae
- Subfamily: Commelinoideae
- Tribe: Commelineae; Meisner, 1842

Genera
- Aneilema; Anthericopsis; Buforrestia; Commelina; Dictyospermum; Floscopa; Murdannia; Pollia; Polyspatha; Pseudoparis; Rhopalephora; Stanfieldiella; Tapheocarpa; Tricarpelema

= Commelineae =

Tribe of flowering plants

Commelineae is a tribe of monocotyledonous flowering plants in the dayflower family (Commelinaceae). The tribe consists of 13 genera and about 350 species. It is one of two tribes in the subfamily Commelinoideae, the other being the Tradescantieae, which is made up of 26 genera and about 300 species. The remaining two genera in the family are in a separate subfamily, the Cartonematoideae.

The Commelineae can be separated morphologically from its sister tribe, the Tradescantieae, through a number of technical characters. These include having six subsidiary cells with the terminal pair always being smaller than the second lateral pair, pollen with a spiny exine and a perforate tectum, primarily zygomorphic flowers, non-moniliform filament hairs, no silica in the epidermis, and small chromosomes. Molecular phylogenetics generally supports the separation of the two tribes.
