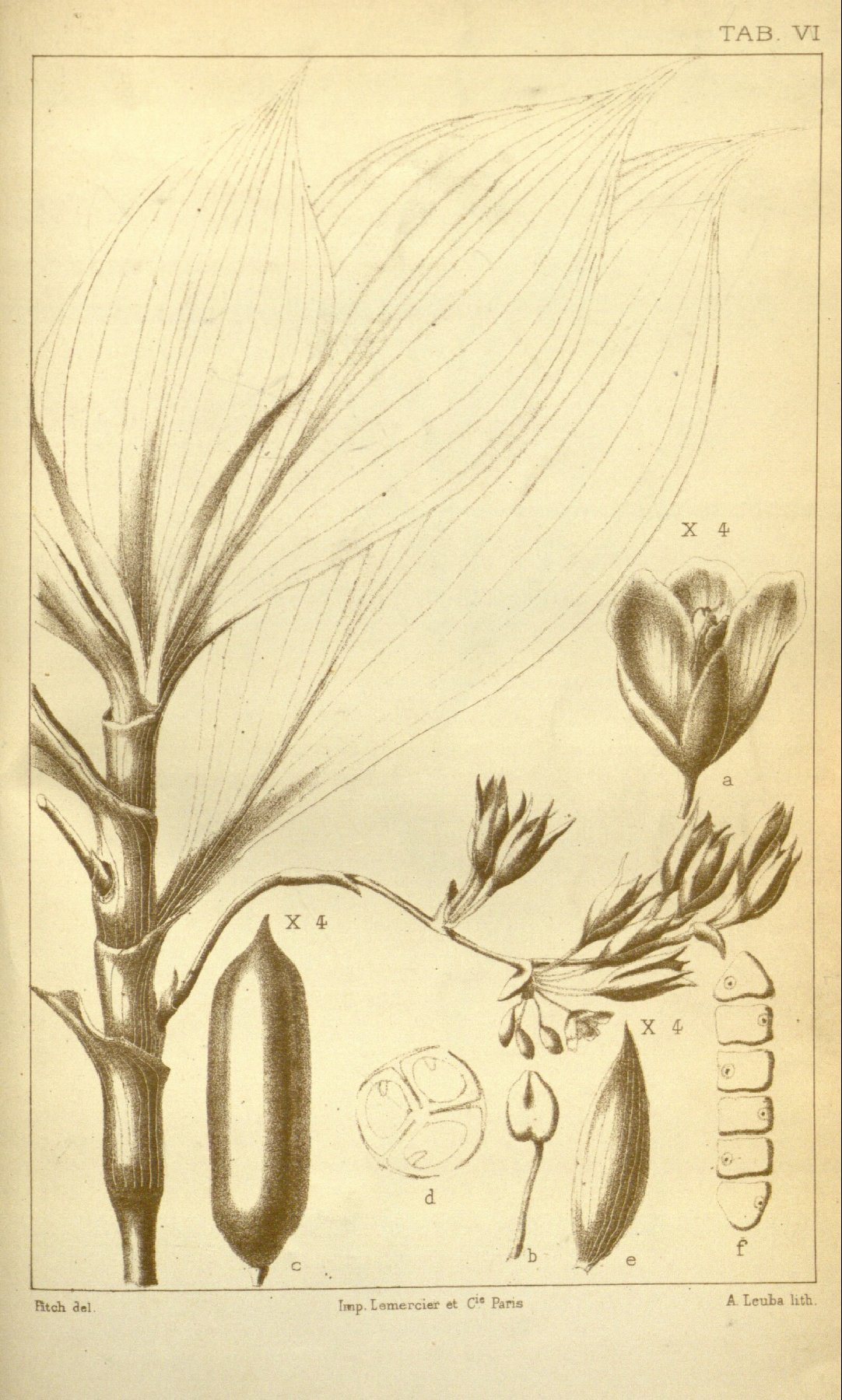
- Buforrestia mannii

Scientific classification
- Kingdom: Plantae
- Clade: Tracheophytes
- Clade: Angiosperms
- Clade: Monocots
- Clade: Commelinids
- Order: Commelinales
- Family: Commelinaceae
- Subfamily: Commelinoideae
- Tribe: Commelineae
- Genus: Buforrestia; C.B.Clarke, 1881

Type species
- Buforrestia mannii C.B.Clarke, 1881

= Buforrestia =

Genus of flowering plants

Buforrestia is a genus of perennial monocotyledonous flowering plants in the dayflower family. The genus contains three known species, with two found in West and Central Africa and one in northeastern South America.

All three occur in tropical closed forest understory. They are most easily distinguished from other genera in the family by their inflorescences that pierce through the leaf sheaths, zygomorphic flowers with three short stamens above and three longer stamens below, and sepals that persist and increase in size as the fruit develops.

Phylogenetic analyses give weak support to the notion that it may form a clade with the genera Stanfieldiella and Floscopa. All three of these genera have six fertile stamens and lack hook-shaped hairs, while Floscopa and Buforrestia both have a unique type of glandular hair and polymorphic petals. However, further work is needed to be certain of relationships.

Species

- Buforrestia candolleana C.B.Clarke - Suriname, French Guiana
- Buforrestia mannii C.B.Clarke - Nigeria Cameroon, Gabon, Congo-Brazzaville, Bioko
- Buforrestia obovata Brenan - Ivory Coast, Sierra Leone, Liberia, Guinea, Ghana, Gabon
