= Coleotrype baronii =

Scientific classification
- Kingdom: Plantae
- Clade: Tracheophytes
- Clade: Angiosperms
- Clade: Monocots
- Clade: Commelinids
- Order: Commelinales
- Family: Commelinaceae
- Genus: Coleotrype
- Species: C. baronii

Binomial name
- Coleotrype baronii Baker

Synonyms
- Coleotrype baronii var. antongilensis H.Perrier; Coleotrype baronii var. ambrensis H.Perrier

Dayflower plant species

Coleotrype baronii is a dayflower plant species described by John Gilbert Baker. It is native to Madagascar.
