= Tapheocarpa =

Scientific classification
- Kingdom: Plantae
- Clade: Tracheophytes
- Clade: Angiosperms
- Clade: Monocots
- Clade: Commelinids
- Order: Commelinales
- Family: Commelinaceae
- Subfamily: Commelinoideae
- Tribe: Commelineae
- Genus: Tapheocarpa; Conran
- Species: T. calandrinioides

Binomial name
- Tapheocarpa calandrinioides (F.Muell.) Conran

Synonyms
- Aneilema calandrinioides F.Muell.

Genus of plants

Tapheocarpa is a genus of monocotyledonous flowering plants in the family Commelinaceae, first described as a genus in 1994. The genus consists of a single known species, Tapheocarpa calandrinioides, endemic to the State of Queensland in Australia.
