= Aetheolirion =

Scientific classification
- Kingdom: Plantae
- Clade: Tracheophytes
- Clade: Angiosperms
- Clade: Monocots
- Clade: Commelinids
- Order: Commelinales
- Family: Commelinaceae
- Subfamily: Commelinoideae
- Tribe: Tradescantieae
- Subtribe: Streptoliriinae
- Genus: Aetheolirion; Forman
- Species: A. stenolobium

Binomial name
- Aetheolirion stenolobium Forman

Genus of flowering plants

Aetheolirion is a genus of flowering plants in the dayflower family Commelinaceae, first described in 1962. It contains just one species, Aetheolirion stenolobium, which is endemic to Thailand.
