= Streptolirion =

Scientific classification
- Kingdom: Plantae
- Clade: Tracheophytes
- Clade: Angiosperms
- Clade: Monocots
- Clade: Commelinids
- Order: Commelinales
- Family: Commelinaceae
- Subfamily: Commelinoideae
- Tribe: Tradescantieae
- Subtribe: Streptoliriinae
- Genus: Streptolirion; Edgew.

Species
- Streptolirion lineare Fukuoka & N.Kurosaki; Streptolirion volubile Edgew.

Genus of flowering plants

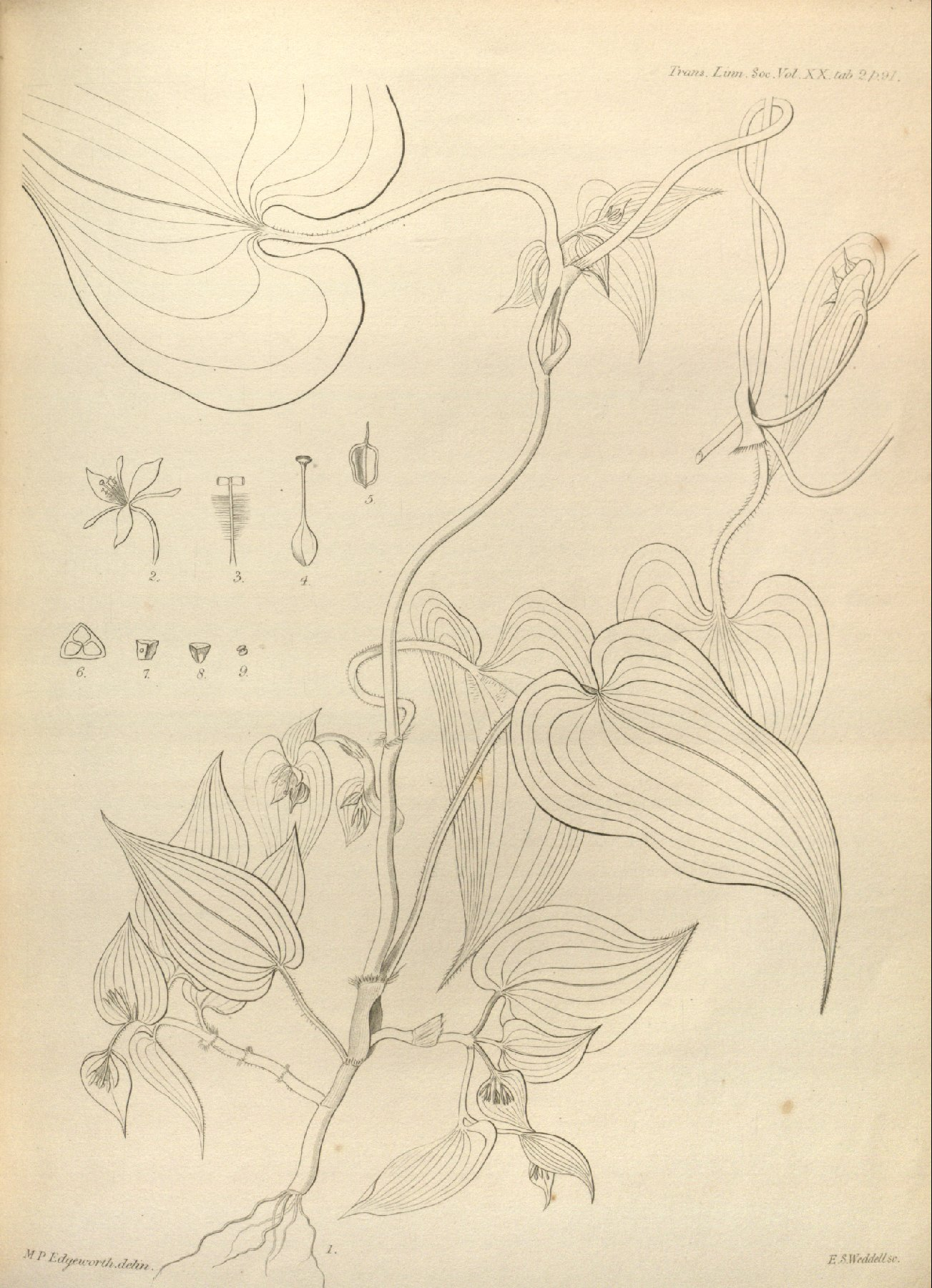
Botanical illustration of Streptolirion volubile

Streptolirion is a genus of flowering plants in the family Commelinaceae. It includes two species native to Asia, ranging from Japan and Manchuria to Indochina and the Himalayas.

- Streptolirion lineare Fukuoka & N.Kurosaki – Japan
- Streptolirion volubile Edgew. – Japan and Manchuria to Indochina and the Himalayas

Streptolirion can be distinguished from the closely related climber Spatholirion by the former's two-seeded carpels and inflorescences that are all subtended by large involucral bracts. They bear yellow hairs below the anthers, which are believed to increase floral attraction by contrasting with the petals or suggesting additional pollen is present.

The genus was first described in 1845 by Michael Pakenham Edgeworth and included a single species, Streptolirion volubile. An analysis of chromosomes found major differences between Japanese and Indian populations, suggesting that an additional species might exist. In 1991 Nobuyuki Fukuoka and Nobuhira Kurosaki designated the Japanese population as a new species, Streptolirion lineare.
