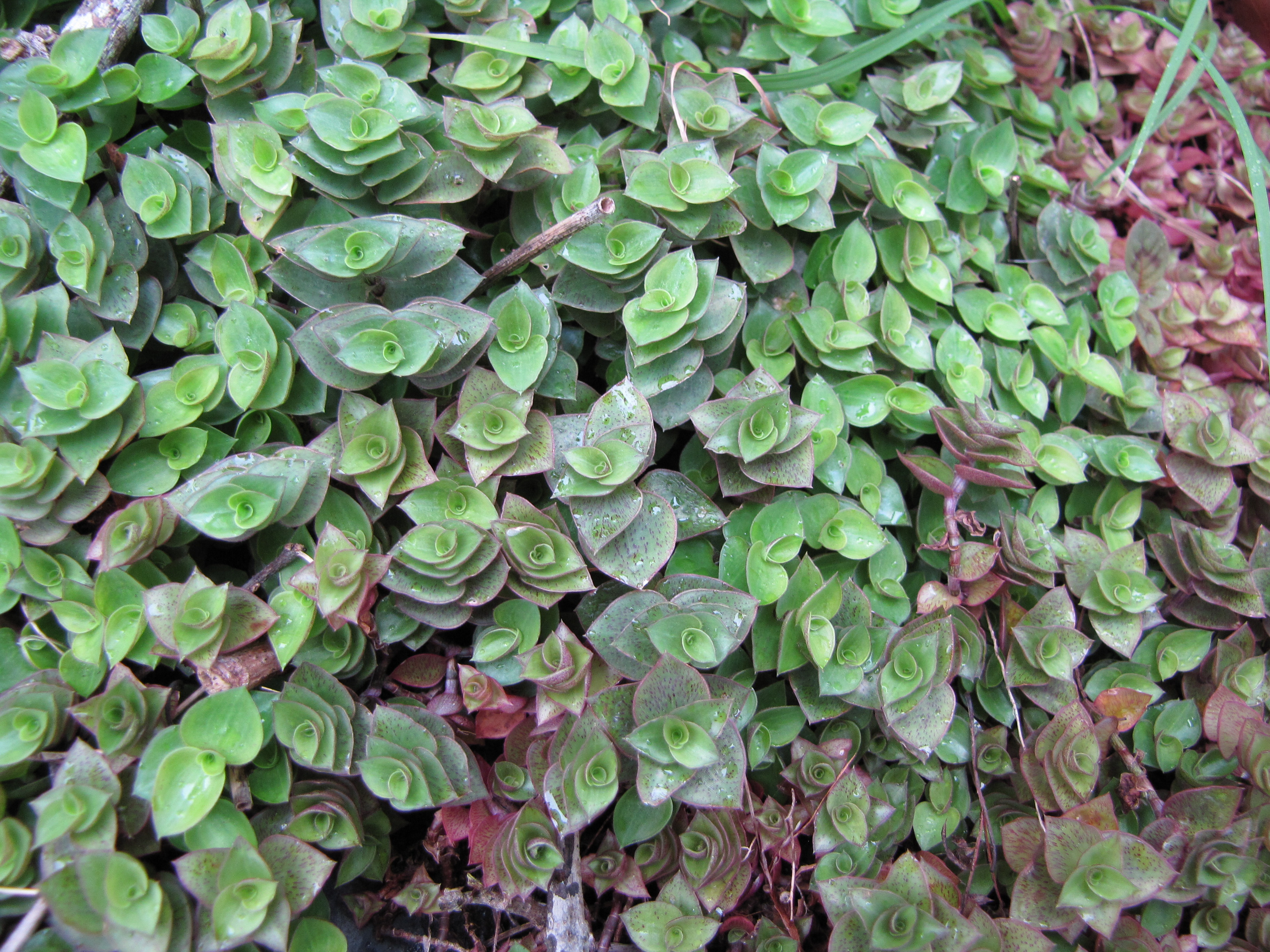

Scientific classification
- Kingdom: Plantae
- Clade: Tracheophytes
- Clade: Angiosperms
- Clade: Monocots
- Clade: Commelinids
- Order: Commelinales
- Family: Commelinaceae
- Genus: Callisia
- Species: C. repens

Binomial name
- Callisia repens (Jacq., 1762)

Synonyms
- Hapalanthus repens Jacq.; Tradescantia callisia Sw.; Spironema robbinsii C.Wright; Commelina hexandra mandonii; Callisia repens mandonii; Callisia repens ciliata

= Callisia repens =

Species of flowering plant

Callisia repens, also known as creeping inchplant or turtle vine, is a succulent creeping plant from the family Commelinaceae. This species comes from Central and South America.

== Description ==
The perennial plant forms creeping mats. The flowering shoots are ascending. The fleshy, delicate leaves grow smaller towards the tip of the shoot. The leaf blade is oval to lanceolate, 1-3.5 centimeters long and 0.6-1 centimeter wide. In the distal leaves, the blades are narrower than the open, spread leaf sheaths. It grows quickly, multiplies easily by long, creeping shoots that root in each node, as soon as it is on the ground.

The inflorescences sit in the axils of the distal leaves of the flower sprout and consist of paired cymes. Produced in the summer, the flowers are hermaphroditic and odorless. The bracts are inconspicuous, white, lanceolate and three to six millimeters long. There are zero to six stamens with smooth filaments. The ovary is bipartite and has a brush-like scar. Capsule fruits with one millimeter large seeds develop.

== Distribution ==
The species is native to America from the southeast of the United States (Texas, Florida) via the West Indies (Guadeloupe and Martinique) to Argentina and grows in shady, rocky or gravelly spots in subtropical to tropical forests. It is naturalized in Hong Kong and grows on rooftops. In Western Australia, it is an invasive species due to its rapid growth, its tolerance to various environments and the ground cover effect which make it spread very quickly, suffocating local plants or preventing them from germinating.

== Cultivation ==
The species is sometimes used as an ornamental plant and it is easily propagated by cuttings. It is also marketed as a houseplant for its drooping habit and the scent of its white flowers. Strong light makes the foliage blush, the plant can stand direct sunlight if there is much humidity. The optimum growth conditions are between 18–22 °C during the day and at least 12 °C at night. Pests include snails.
