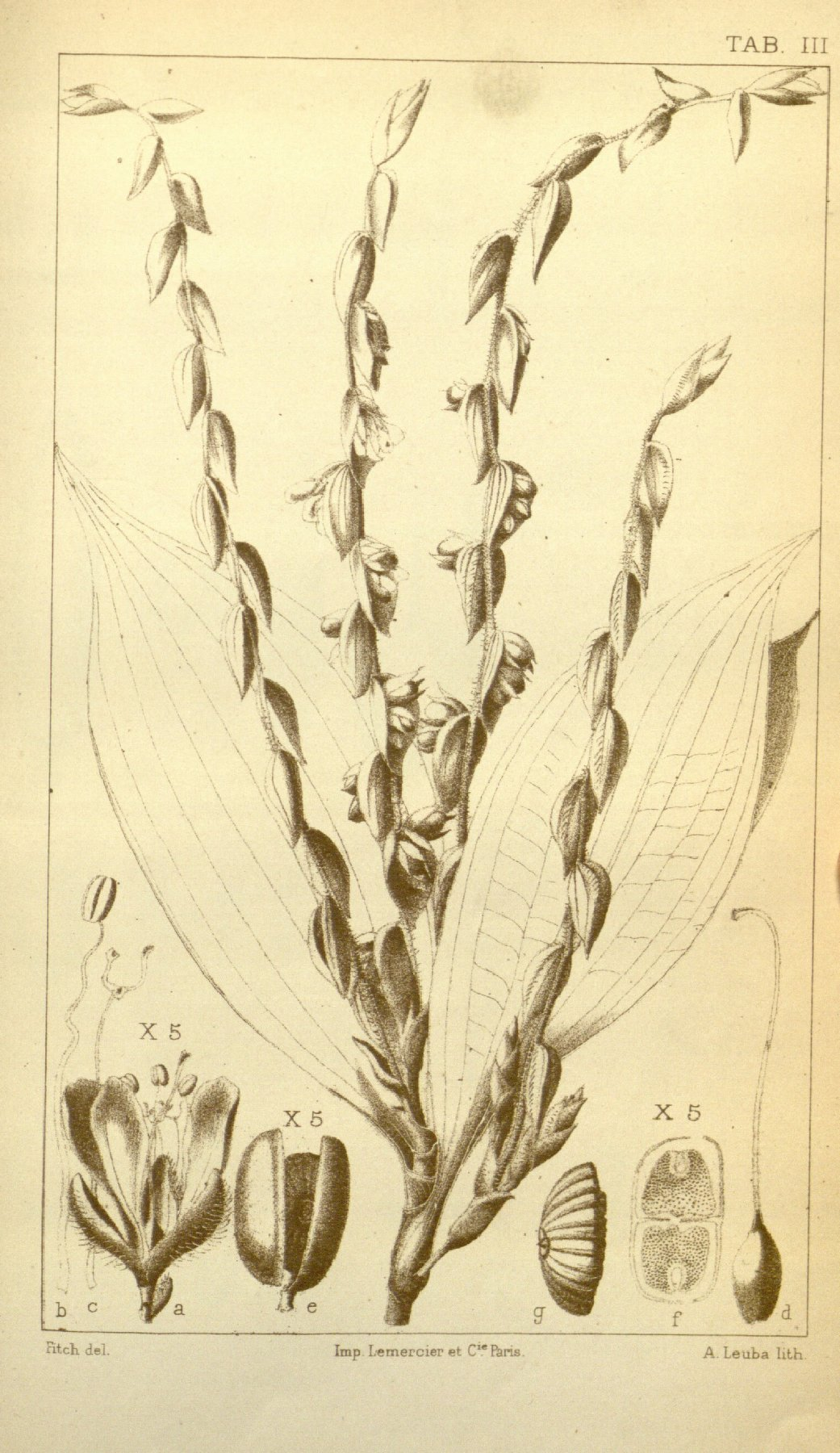
- Polyspatha paniculata

Scientific classification
- Kingdom: Plantae
- Clade: Tracheophytes
- Clade: Angiosperms
- Clade: Monocots
- Clade: Commelinids
- Order: Commelinales
- Family: Commelinaceae
- Subfamily: Commelinoideae
- Tribe: Commelineae
- Genus: Polyspatha; Benth., 1849

Type species
- Polyspatha paniculata Benth.

= Polyspatha =

Genus of plants

Polyspatha is a genus of perennial monocotyledonous flowering plants in the family Commelinaceae. It is restricted to tropical Africa consists of three recognized species.

The genus is characterised by its unique leaf-like bracts that subtend inflorescences (often called spathes), which are arranged oppositely up the flowering shoot. Plants in the genus also have white flowers, two carpels with one seed in each, and vegetative reproduction by stolons. Along with most other genera of the Commelineae tribe with relatively few species, Polyspatha is found in tropical forest understories, and also in disturbed shady locations.

Species

- Polyspatha paniculata Benth. - western + central Africa from Sierra Leone to Zaire + Tanzania
- Polyspatha oligospatha Faden - western + central Africa from Ivory Coast to Zaire + Sudan
- Polyspatha hirsuta Mildbr. - western + central Africa from Sierra Leone to Zaire + Uganda
