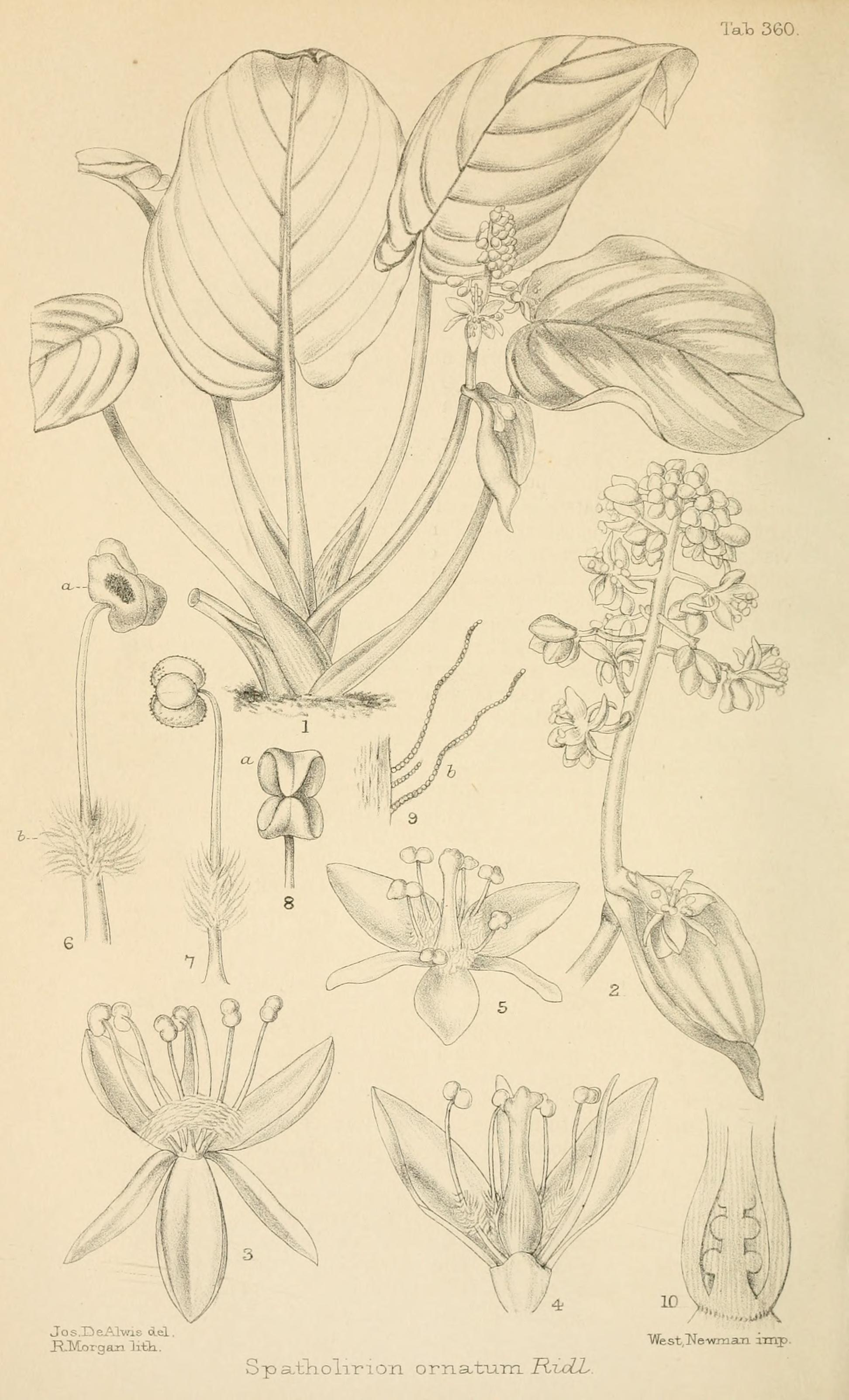
- Spatholirion ornatum

Scientific classification
- Kingdom: Plantae
- Clade: Tracheophytes
- Clade: Angiosperms
- Clade: Monocots
- Clade: Commelinids
- Order: Commelinales
- Family: Commelinaceae
- Subfamily: Commelinoideae
- Tribe: Tradescantieae
- Subtribe: Streptoliriinae
- Genus: Spatholirion; Ridl.

Type species
- Spatholirion ornatum Ridl

= Spatholirion =

Genus of flowering plants

Spatholirion is a genus of climbing or rosette monocotyledonous flowering plants in the dayflower family. It is distributed from China in the north, south to Thailand, Vietnam, and northern Peninsular Malaysia. It has four to eight seeds per carpel, unlike the closely related Streptolirion, which has only two, and white or purple petals. The inflorescence axis of Spatholirion longifolium and all of its branches are a bright purple, probably aiding in visual pollinator attraction. The genus was first described in 1896 by Henry Nicholas Ridley, the father of the commercial rubber industry, from plants sent to Kew Gardens from the Malay Peninsula near the border between Thailand and Malaysia. All species have a diploid chromosome number of 20.

Species

- Spatholirion calcicola K.Larsen & S.S.Larsen - Thailand
- Spatholirion decumbens Fukuoka & N.Kurosaki - Thailand
- Spatholirion elegans (Cherfils) C.Y.Wu - Yunnan, Vietnam
- Spatholirion longifolium (Gagnep.) Dunn - Vietnam, Fujian, Guangdong, Guangxi, Guizhou, Hubei, Hunan, Jiangxi, Sichuan, Yunnan
- Spatholirion ornatum Ridl. - Peninsular Malaysia
- Spatholirion puluongense Aver. - Vietnam
