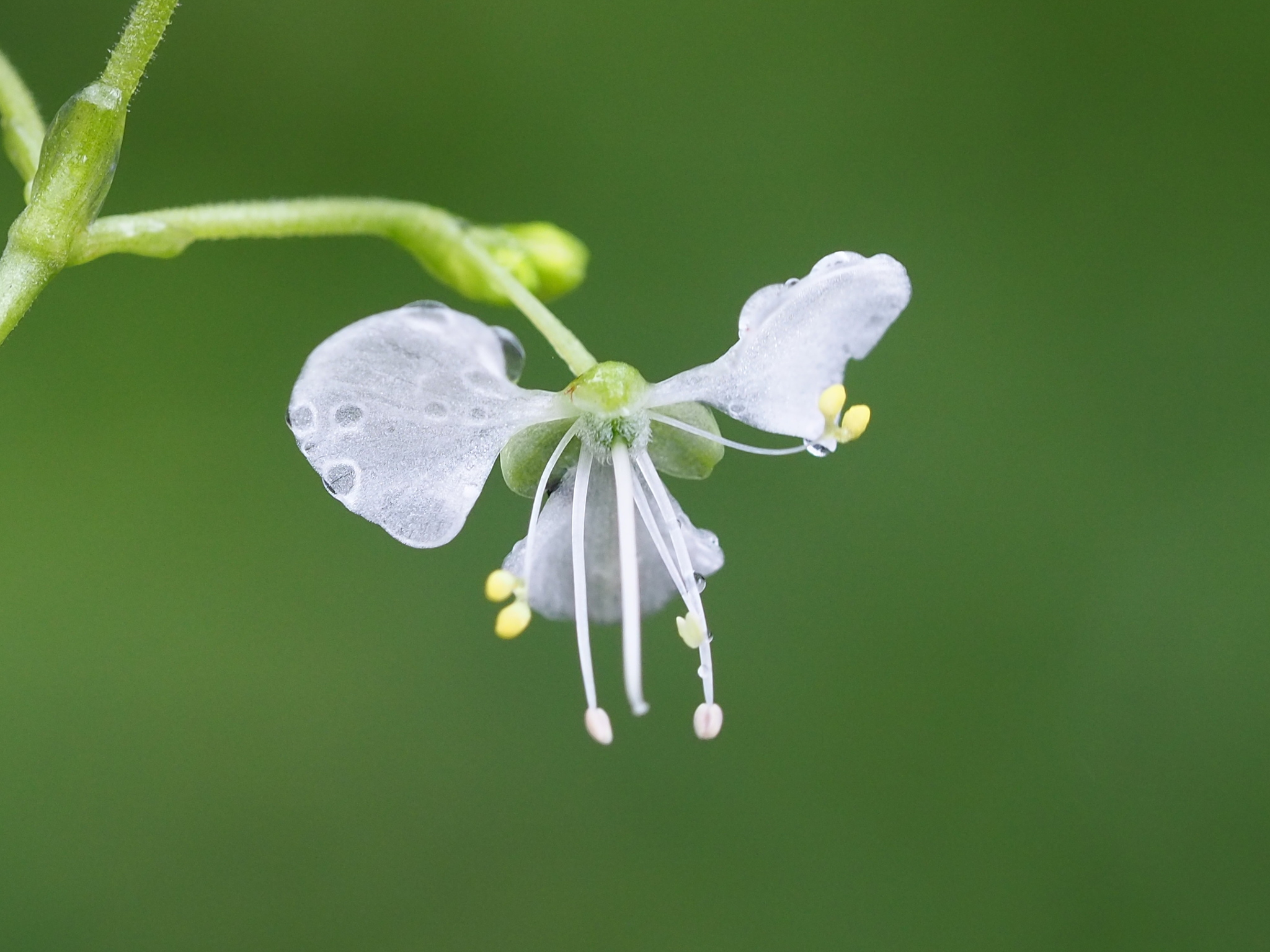
- Rhopalephora scaberrima

Scientific classification
- Kingdom: Plantae
- Clade: Tracheophytes
- Clade: Angiosperms
- Clade: Monocots
- Clade: Commelinids
- Order: Commelinales
- Family: Commelinaceae
- Subfamily: Commelinoideae
- Tribe: Commelineae
- Genus: Rhopalephora; Hassk.

Type species
- Rhopalephora micrantha (Vahl) Faden

Synonyms
- Piletocarpus Hassk.

= Rhopalephora =

Genus of plants

Rhopalephora is a genus of monocotyledonous flowering plants in the family Commelinaceae, first described in 1864. It is native to Asia, Madagascar, and a few islands in the Pacific.

Species

- Rhopalephora micrantha (Vahl) Faden - Java
- Rhopalephora rugosa (H.Perrier) Faden - Madagascar
- Rhopalephora scaberrima (Blume) Faden - China (including Taiwan + Tibet), Indian Subcontinent, Indochina, Borneo, Java, Philippines
- Rhopalephora vitiensis (Seem.) Faden - Maluku, Fiji, Samoa, Tonga
