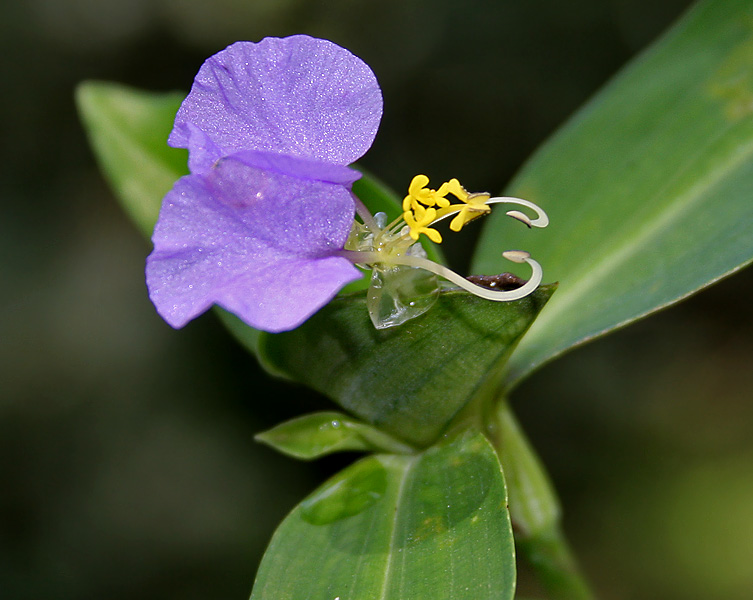
- Commelina maculata in Narsapur, Medak district, Andhra Pradesh, India, showing spathe and inflorescence

Scientific classification
- Kingdom: Plantae
- Clade: Tracheophytes
- Clade: Angiosperms
- Clade: Monocots
- Clade: Commelinids
- Order: Commelinales
- Family: Commelinaceae
- Genus: Commelina
- Species: C. maculata

Binomial name
- Commelina maculata Edgew.

= Commelina maculata =

Species of flowering plant

Commelina maculata is an herbaceous plant in the dayflower family found in India, Burma, Bhutan, and southern China. It is most often encountered along forest margins, in grasslands, along roadsides, or in moist ditches. The species is characterized by its short-stalked spathes with fused margins that usually occur in clusters of two or three, bearing flowers that barely stick out from the mouth of the spathe. The species is very similar to Commelina paludosa, and further study is needed to recognize the boundary between the two. The two are typically differentiated on the basis of C. paludosa having larger and more numerous spathes that occur in clusters of four to ten, forming a sort of head. C. paludosa is also reported to have larger leaves, a more erect habit, less branching, and thicker stems. On the other hand, C. maculata is supposed to have heads of only two to three spathes, low-growing stems, numerous branches, slender stems that root at the nodes, and leaves less than ten cm long by two and a half cm wide.
