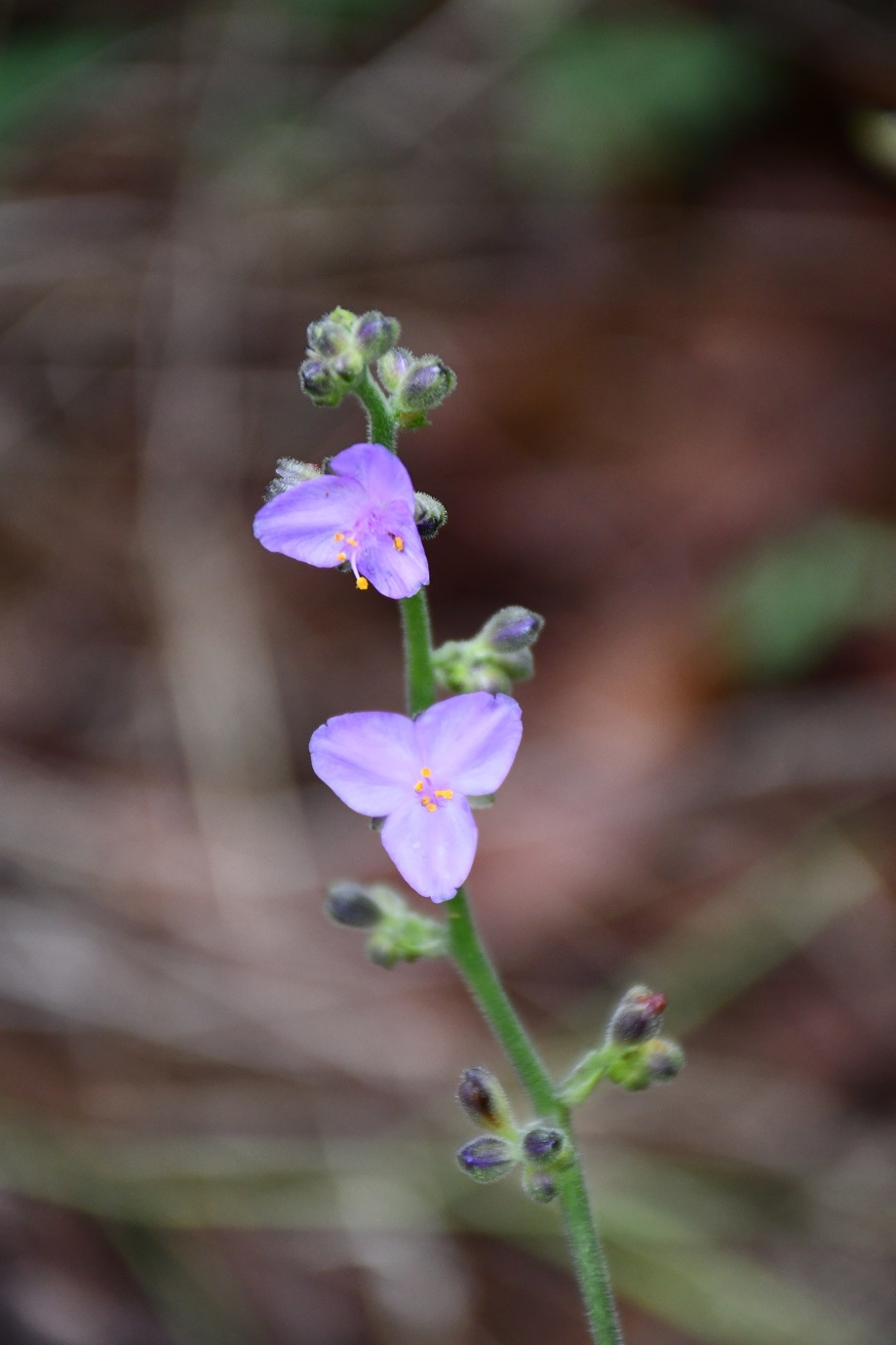
- Thyrsanthemum floribundum

Scientific classification
- Kingdom: Plantae
- Clade: Tracheophytes
- Clade: Angiosperms
- Clade: Monocots
- Clade: Commelinids
- Order: Commelinales
- Family: Commelinaceae
- Subfamily: Commelinoideae
- Tribe: Tradescantieae
- Subtribe: Thyrsanthemineae
- Genus: Thyrsanthemum; Pichon

Type species
- Thyrsanthemum floribundum (M.Martens & Galeotti) Pichon

Synonyms
- Gibasoides D.R.Hunt

= Thyrsanthemum =

Genus of flowering plants

Thyrsanthemum is a genus of plants in the Commelinaceae, first described in 1946. The entire genus is endemic to Mexico.

== Species ==
Four species are accepted.

- Thyrsanthemum floribundum (M.Martens & Galeotti) Pichon - Guerrero, Jalisco, Oaxaca, Michoacán, Hidalgo, Puebla
- Thyrsanthemum goldianum D.R.Hunt - Guerrero, Michoacán, México State, Nayarit
- Thyrsanthemum laxiflorum (C.B.Clarke) M.Pell. & Espejo – central and southwestern Mexico
- Thyrsanthemum macrophyllum (Greenm.) Rohweder - Oaxaca
