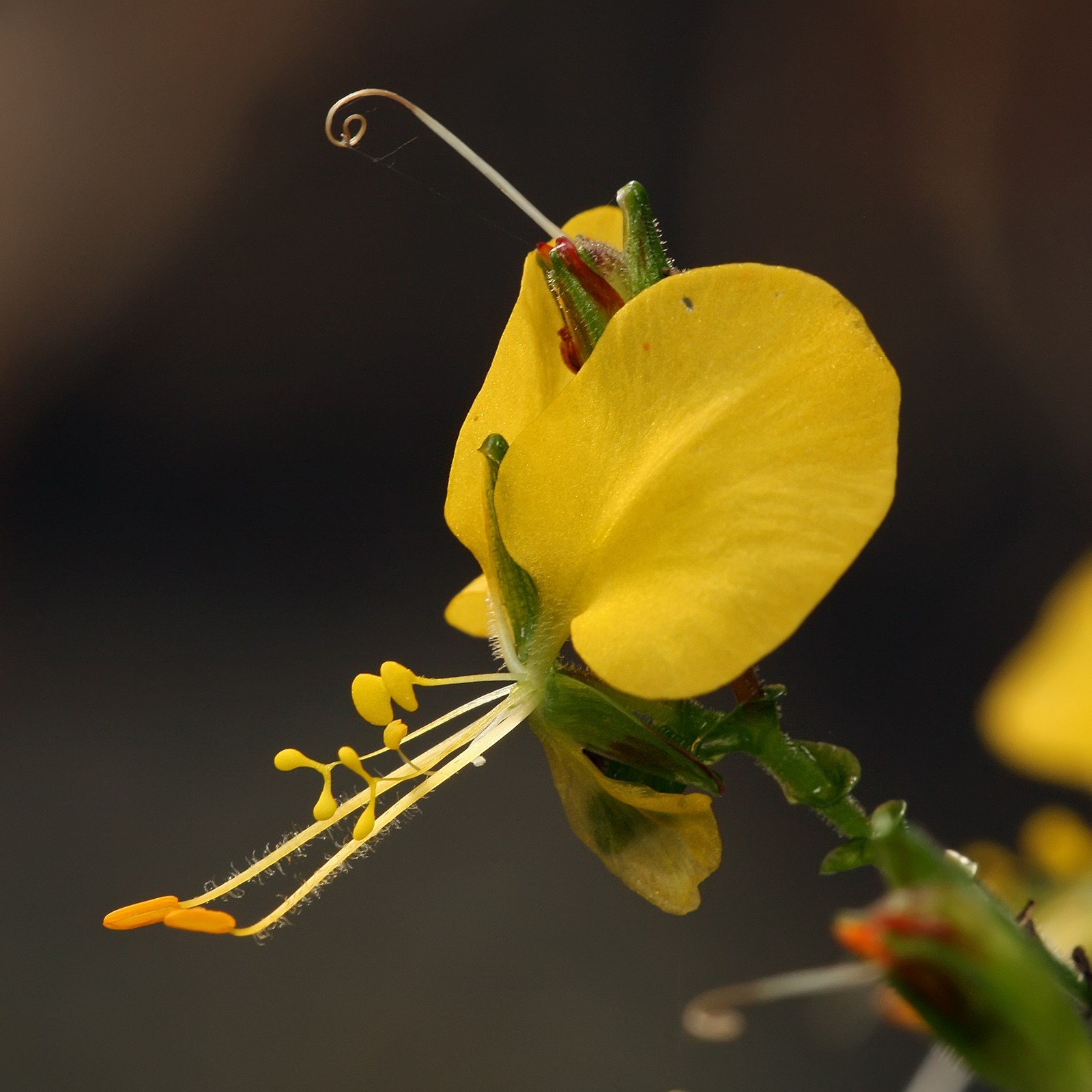

Scientific classification
- Kingdom: Plantae
- Clade: Tracheophytes
- Clade: Angiosperms
- Clade: Monocots
- Clade: Commelinids
- Order: Commelinales
- Family: Commelinaceae
- Genus: Aneilema
- Species: A. aequinoctiale

Binomial name
- Aneilema aequinoctiale (P.Beauv.) G.Don

Synonyms
- Aneilema adhaerens Kunth

= Aneilema aequinoctiale =

Species of flowering plant

Aneilema aequinoctiale is a flowering shrub native to much of sub-Saharan Africa. It is sometimes referred to by its English common name, clinging aneilema, and in Yoruba, a language of West Africa, it may be referred to as ẹfĩajija.

== Description and habit ==
A. aequinoctiale is a perennial shrub, sometimes considered a herb, that may be scrambling or erect in habit. It can grow up to two metres in height. The leaves and their leaf-sheaths, arranged distichously on the stem, are pale green and covered in fine, hooked hairs that give a "sticky" feeling. Leaf shapes may be ovate or lanceolate to elliptic. Roots of the plant are fibrous and thin.

The inflorescences are usually terminal, and the cincinni may be whorled, opposite, or alternate. The petals of A. aequinoctiale are bright yellow and grow as a single pair, with a third petal either absent or small and withered. The flowers are short-lived, opening daily from approximately 07:00 to 10:00 during the flowering season, which is September through June. The flowers may be perfect, possessing both male and female reproductive organs, or may be staminate only. The capsules are generally oblong to obovate, and seeds are brown.

== Natural habitat, cultivation, and uses ==
A. aequinoctiale prefers moist, partially shaded areas, and often grows on forest margins and by streams, though it can also be found growing in grassland, farmland, and roadside scrub. It is widespread in several regions of West and East Africa, though it is reported as being more widely cultivated and made use of in Nigeria, Uganda, Kenya, Zanzibar, and Zimbabwe.

Ungulates may graze on the plant in grassland areas, such as Kenya, though its main uses in Africa are medicinal, culinary, and domestic. In the Ondo regions of Nigeria, infants may be bathed in a wash made from the roots of A. aequinoctiale. In other regions, the roots may be used as feed for livestock, and leaves may be cooked like spinach. The plant may be used to relieve colds in Zanzibar, though throughout Africa, the roots serve many other medicinal purposes, being used to treat skin disorders, diseases of the eye, constipation, leprosy, kwashiorkor, and amenorrhoea. Its application is also believed to help children with osteomalacia to walk.

Considerable research has confirmed that chimpanzees self-medicate with A. aequinoctiale by swallowing the leaves whole. Not normally a part of the chimpanzee's diet, this behaviour is most often witnessed during rainy seasons, when the animals are most likely to be afflicted with the parasitic nematodes Oesophagostomum stephanostomum and other species of parasitic worms. Examination of the faecal matter of chimpanzees shows that the whole-swallowed leaves remain intact, along with multiple expelled worms. In one dung sample, as many as 20 worms were found, along with 50 undigested leaves. The mechanism through which A. aequinoctiale causes these worms to be expelled from the primates is not yet fully established, though a common factor in the chimpanzee's whole-leaf swallowing of A. aequinoctiale and other plants is the presence of trichomes on the leaves. Trichomes not being easily digestible, the un-chewed and rough surfaces of the leaves are thought to help physically extract the worms from the intestines.
