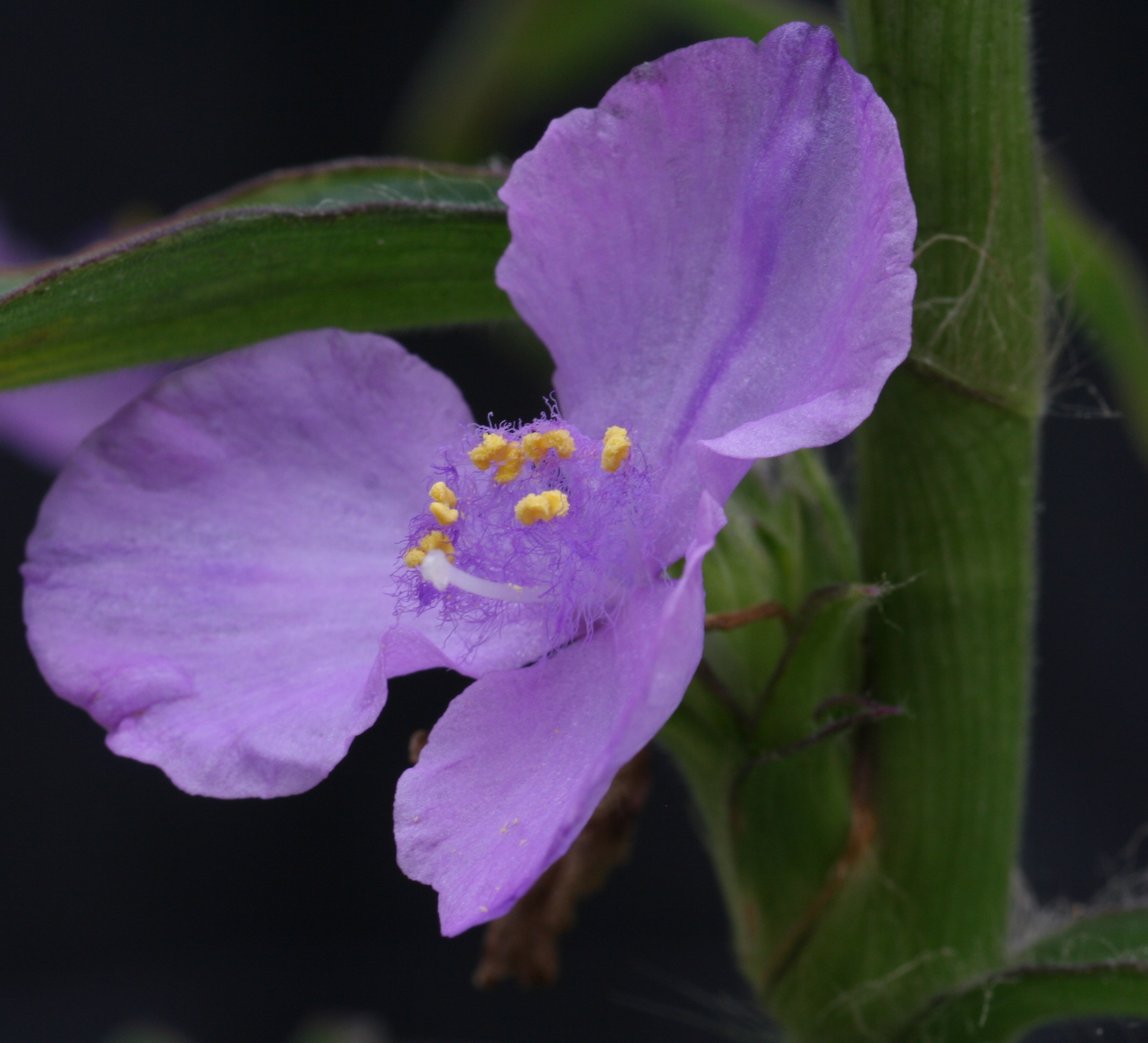
- Coleotrype natalensis growing in a greenhouse; the plant is originally from the Limpopo Province of South Africa.

Scientific classification
- Kingdom: Plantae
- Clade: Tracheophytes
- Clade: Angiosperms
- Clade: Monocots
- Clade: Commelinids
- Order: Commelinales
- Family: Commelinaceae
- Subfamily: Commelinoideae
- Tribe: Tradescantieae
- Subtribe: Coleotrypinae
- Genus: Coleotrype; C.B.Clarke (1881)

Type species
- C. natalensis C.B.Clarke

= Coleotrype =

Genus of flowering plants

Coleotrype is a genus of perennial monocotyledonous flowering plants in the dayflower family. It is found in Africa and Madagascar.

The genus is characterised by its extremely contracted inflorescences with each unit being subtended by a relatively large bract, and the petals that form a short tube at the base in which the stamens are attached to it. Flowers may be either zygomorphic or actinomorphic, and anthers release their pollen either through a pore at the tip or slits down the sides. They are typically encountered in forest understories.

Analysis of DNA sequences has shown that Coleotrype is most closely related to the genus Amischotolype, while these two are in turn most closely related to the genus Cyanotis plus its very close relative Belosynapsis. These four genera form a clade that is found only in the Old World, while all of its immediate ancestors are present only in the New World.

Species

- Coleotrype baronii Baker - Madagascar
- Coleotrype brueckneriana Mildbr. - Kenya, Tanzania
- Coleotrype goudotii C.B.Clarke - Madagascar
- Coleotrype laurentii K.Schum. - western + central Africa
- Coleotrype lutea H.Perrier - Madagascar
- Coleotrype madagascarica C.B.Clarke - Madagascar
- Coleotrype natalensis C.B.Clarke - Eswatini, Mozambique, Zimbabwe, South Africa
- Coleotrype synanthera H.Perrier - Madagascar
- Coleotrype udzungwaensis Faden & Layton - Tanzania
- Coleotrype vermigera H.Perrier - Madagascar
