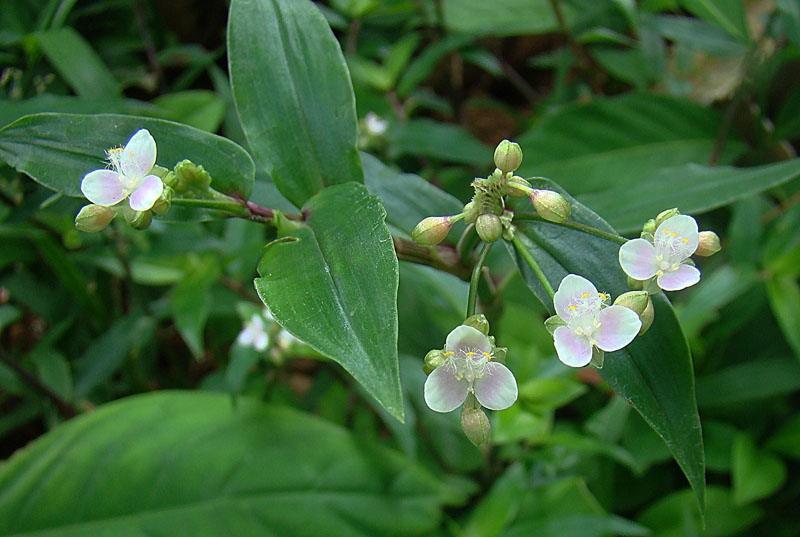
- Tripogandra serrulata

Scientific classification
- Kingdom: Plantae
- Clade: Tracheophytes
- Clade: Angiosperms
- Clade: Monocots
- Clade: Commelinids
- Order: Commelinales
- Family: Commelinaceae
- Subfamily: Commelinoideae
- Tribe: Tradescantieae
- Subtribe: Tradescantiinae
- Genus: Tripogandra; Raf.

Synonyms
- Descantaria Schltdl.; Donnellia C.B.Clarke ex Donn.Sm. 1902 not Austin 1880; Neodonnellia Rose

= Tripogandra =

Genus of flowering plants

Tripogandra is a genus of flowering plants in the spiderwort family, Commelinaceae. It is native to the Western Hemisphere from central Mexico and the West Indies south to Argentina.

Species

- Tripogandra amplexans Handlos - central + southern Mexico
- Tripogandra amplexicaulis (Klotzsch ex C.B.Clarke) Woodson - central + southern Mexico, Guatemala, Honduras, Nicaragua, Costa Rica
- Tripogandra angustifolia (B.L.Rob.) Woodson - Mexico, Guatemala
- Tripogandra brasiliensis Handlos - eastern Brazil
- Tripogandra disgrega (Kunth) Woodson - Mexico, Guatemala, Honduras, El Salvador
- Tripogandra diuretica (Mart.) Handlos - Brazil, Bolivia, Argentina, Paraguay. Uruguay
- Tripogandra elata D.R.Hunt - Goiás, Brasília
- Tripogandra encolea (Diels) J.F.Macbr. - Bolivia, Ecuador, Peru
- Tripogandra glandulosa (Seub.) Rohweder - Trinidad, Venezuela, French Guiana, Peru, Brazil, Bolivia, Argentina, Paraguay. Uruguay
- Tripogandra guerrerensis Matuda - Guerrero
- Tripogandra ionantha (Diels) J.F.Macbr. - Peru
- Tripogandra kruseana Matuda - Guerrero
- Tripogandra montana Handlos - southern Mexico, Guatemala, Honduras, El Salvador
- Tripogandra multiflora (Sw.) Raf. - from southern Mexico south to Argentina, plus Jamaica + Trinidad; naturalized in Azores
- Tripogandra neglecta Handlos - Minas Gerais
- Tripogandra palmeri (Rose) Woodson - western Mexico from Sinaloa south to Guerrero
- Tripogandra purpurascens (S.Schauer) Handlos - from northern Mexico south to Argentina
- Tripogandra saxicola (Greenm.) Woodson - Morelos, Puebla, Guerrero
- Tripogandra serrulata (Vahl) Handlos - central + southern Mexico, Central America, West Indies, northern South America
- Tripogandra silvatica Handlos - Veracruz
- Tripogandra warmingiana (Seub.) Handlos - Bahia, Minas Gerais, Rio de Janeiro
