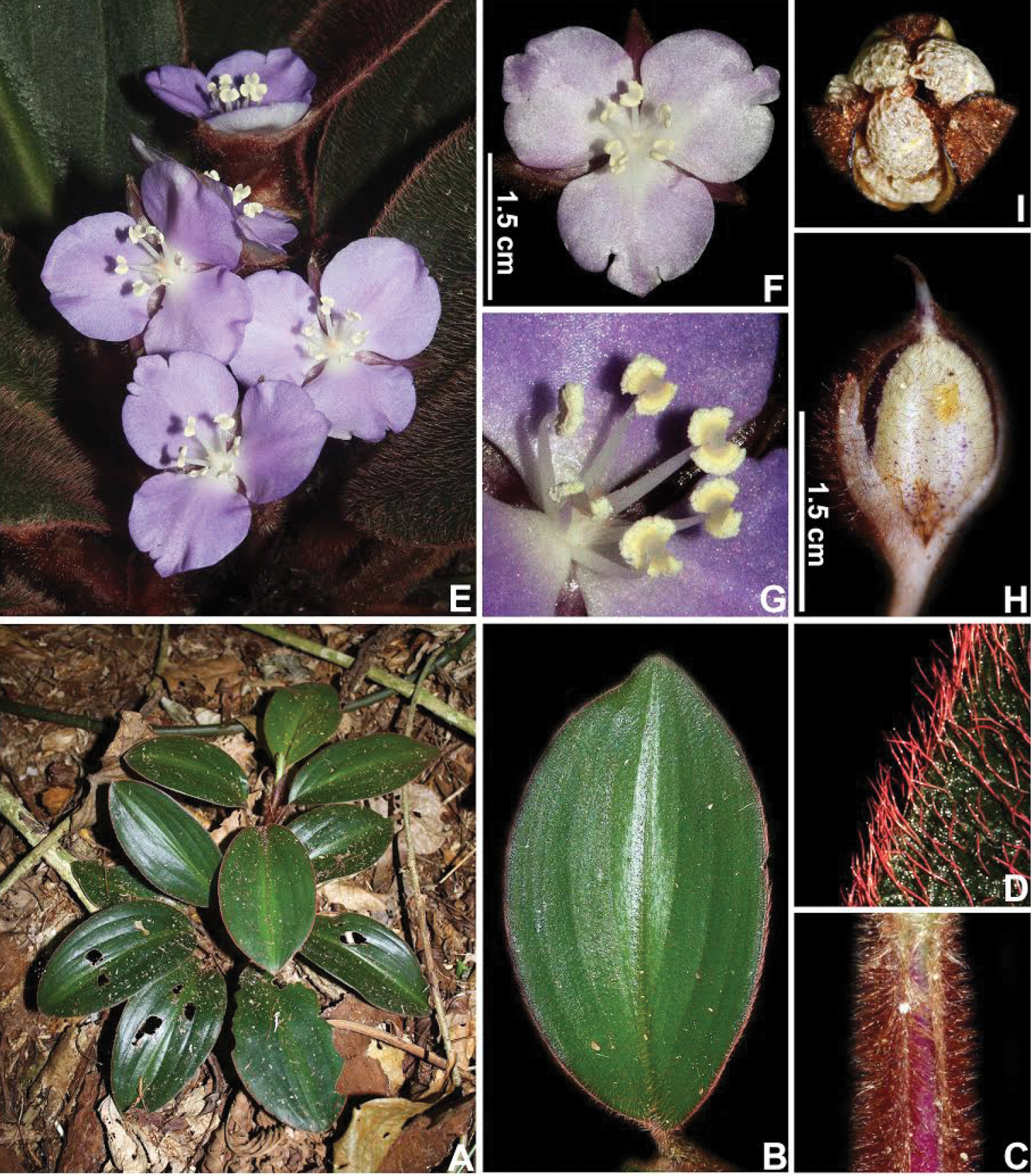

Scientific classification
- Kingdom: Plantae
- Clade: Tracheophytes
- Clade: Angiosperms
- Clade: Monocots
- Clade: Commelinids
- Order: Commelinales
- Family: Commelinaceae
- Subfamily: Commelinoideae
- Tribe: Tradescantieae
- Subtribe: Dichorisandrinae
- Genus: Siderasis; Raf.
- Species: S. fuscata

Binomial name
- Siderasis fuscata (Lodd.) H.E.Moore

Synonyms
- Pyrrheima Hassk.; Siderasis acaulis Raf.; Tradescantia fuscata G.Lodd.; Pyrrheima loddigesii Hassk.; Pyrrheima fuscatum (G.Lodd.) Backer; Tradescantia hirsutissima Pohl ex Seub.; Pyrrheima minus Hassk.; Pyrrheima loddigesii var. minus (Hassk.) C.B.Clarke

= Siderasis =

Genus of flowering plants

Siderasis is a genus of monocotyledonous flowering plants in the dayflower family, first described in 1837. It consists of a single known species, Siderasis fuscata, endemic to the State of Rio de Janeiro in southeastern Brazil, though it is also naturalized on the Island of Java in Indonesia.

Common English names of Siderasis fuscata are "bears ears" for their leaves being covered in many tiny "hairs" and their broad oval shape and "brown spiderwort" because the color mix of its foliage sometimes is perceived as "chocolate-colored".

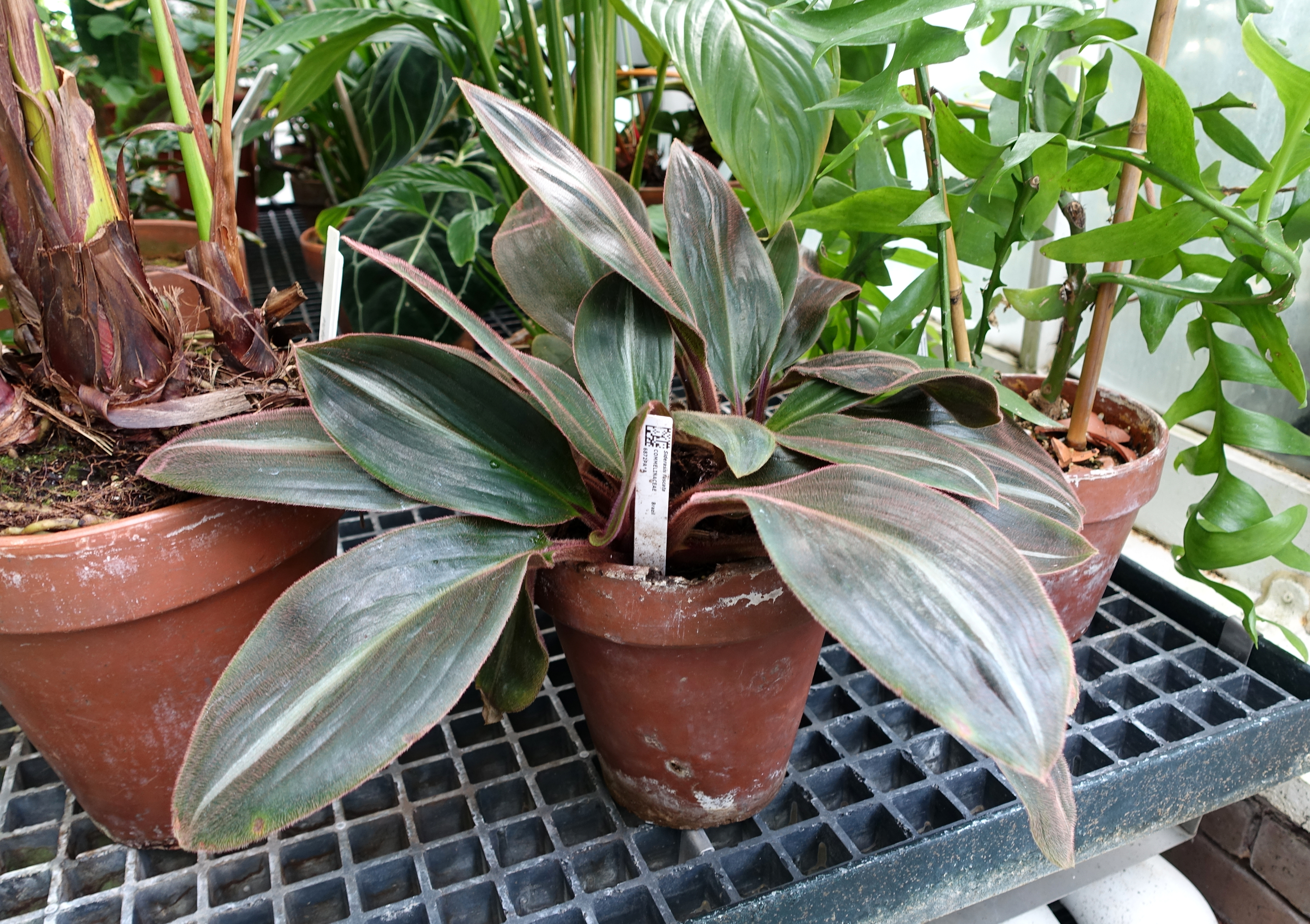
a potted Siderasis fuscata, showing the size and shape of the leaves, the middle line and here looking brownish

The upper sides of the leaves are green with silvery and reddish hues and a lighter stripe down the middle; their undersides are reddish purple.

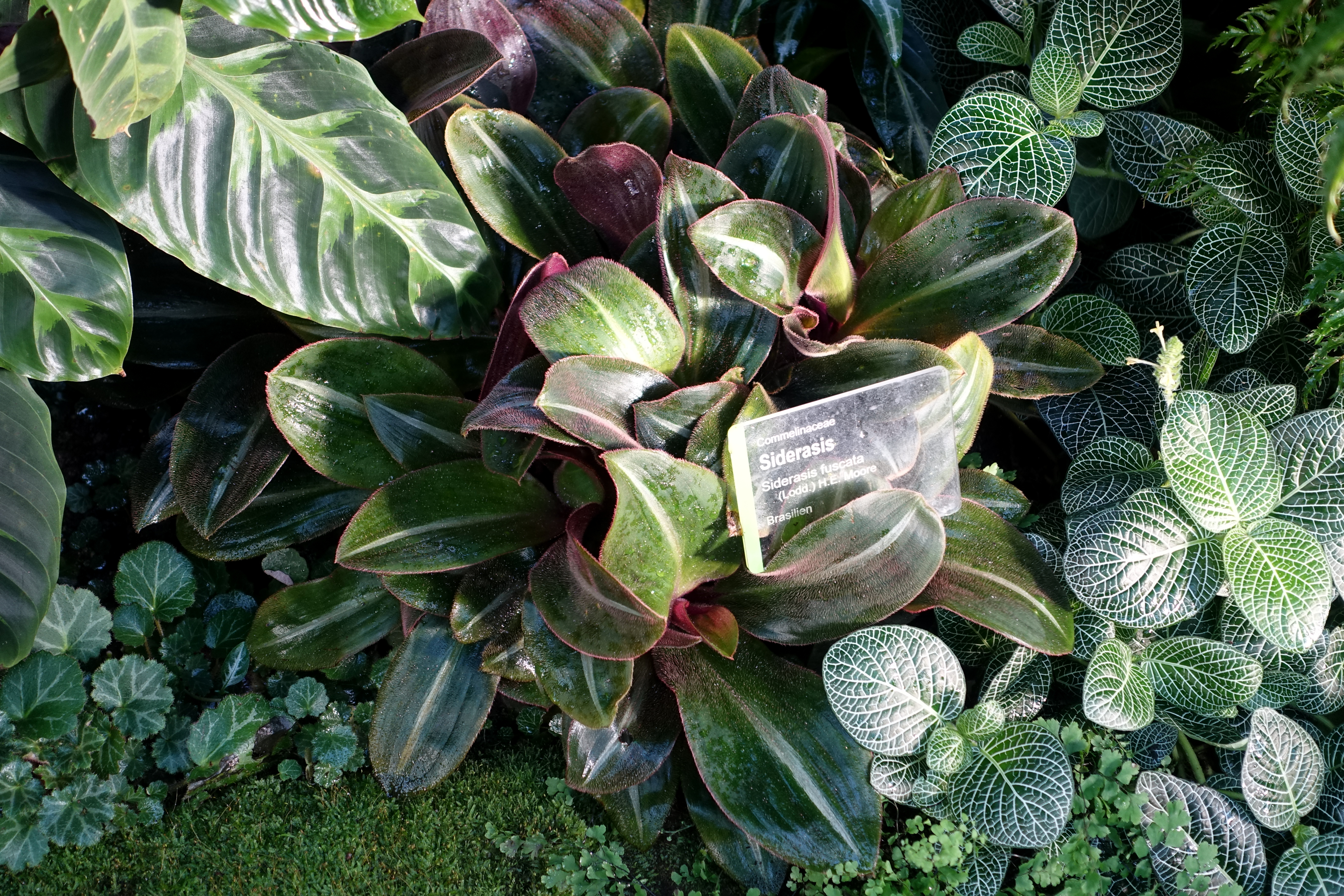
Siderasis fuscata planted between other leavy vegetation of different colourings showing its green and purple and furry "hairs"

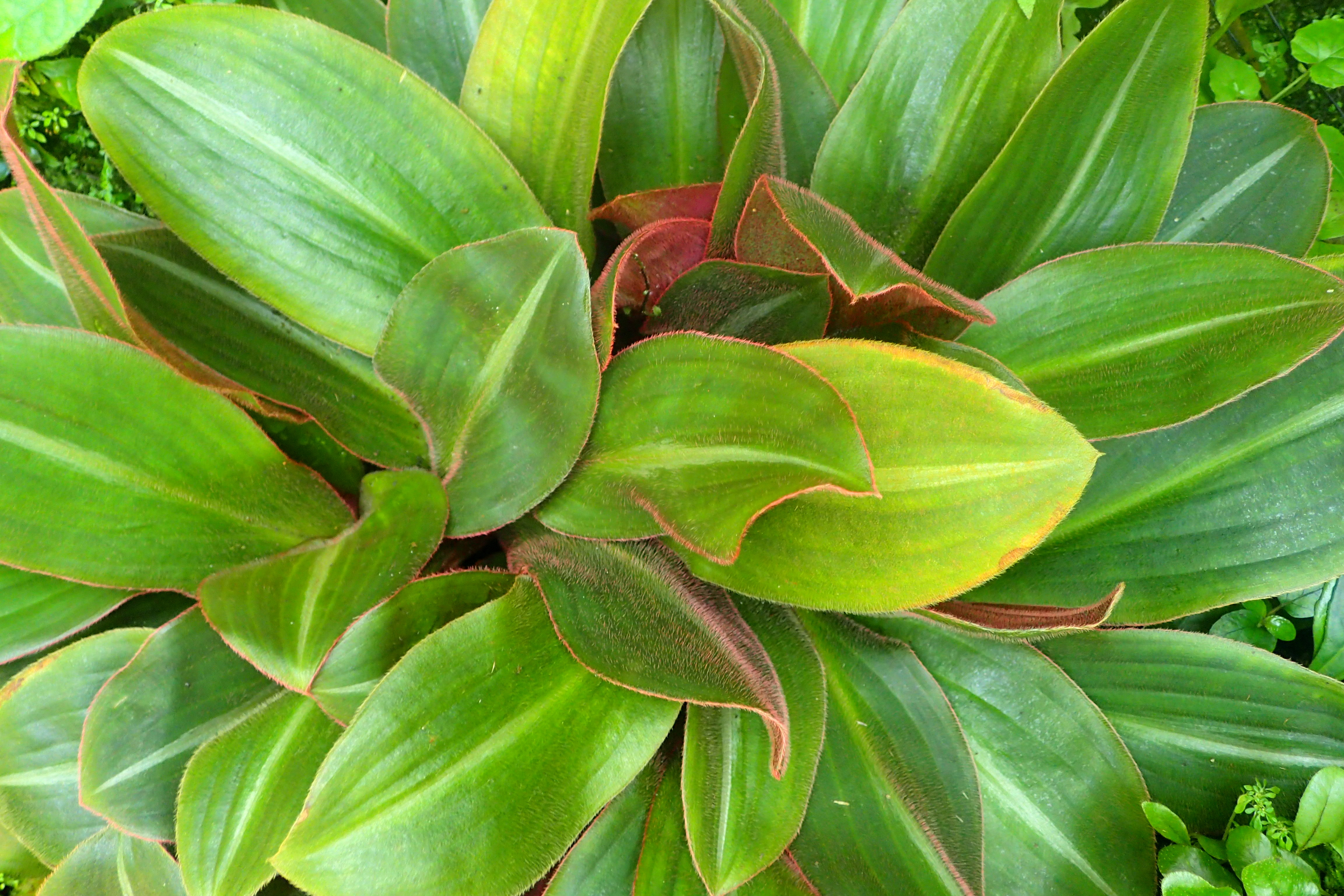
Siderasis fuscata in another light looking more yellowish green and lighter reddish purple and showing its low growing habitus

Its flowers have three blueish purple petals; for their similarity to Tradescantiaflowers, Siderasis had formerly been included in Tradescantiae.

In warmer climates, Siderasis can be planted in parks and gardens; in temperate regions it is kept by botanical gardens in glass houses and used as houseplants.
