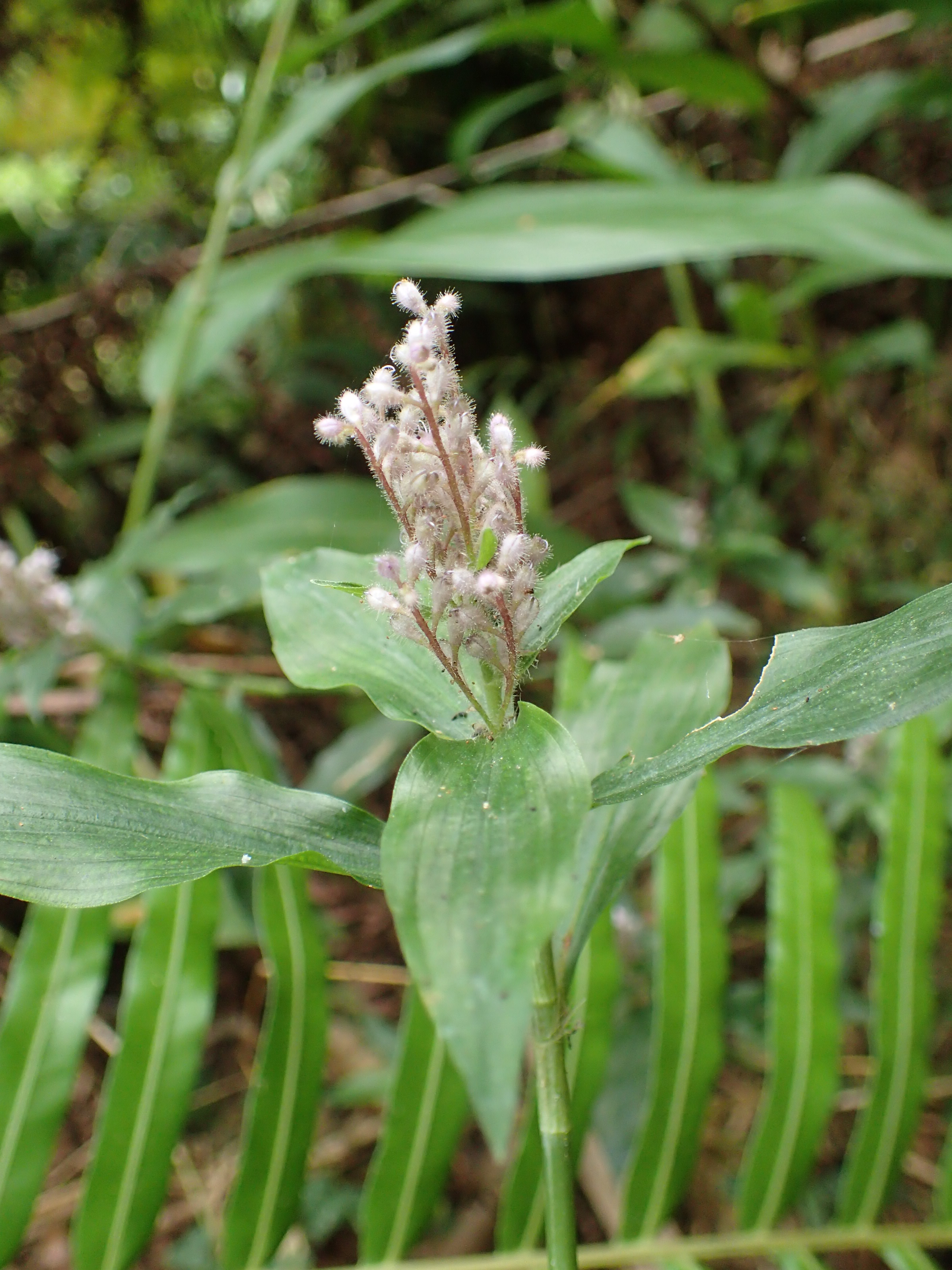
- Floscopa scandens

Scientific classification
- Kingdom: Plantae
- Clade: Tracheophytes
- Clade: Angiosperms
- Clade: Monocots
- Clade: Commelinids
- Order: Commelinales
- Family: Commelinaceae
- Subfamily: Commelinoideae
- Tribe: Commelineae
- Genus: Floscopa; Lour.

Synonyms
- Dithyrocarpus Kunth

= Floscopa =

Genus of flowering plants

Floscopa is a genus of plants in the family Commelinaceae first described in 1790. It is widespread in tropical and subtropical areas: Africa, Madagascar, the Indian subcontinent, Southeast Asia, China, Queensland, Central + South America.

Species

- Floscopa africana (P.Beauv.) C.B.Clarke - from Liberia east to Uganda
- Floscopa aquatica Hua - from Sierra Leone + Mali east to Gabon
- Floscopa axillaris (Poir.) C.B.Clarke - West Africa from Senegal to Benin
- Floscopa confusa Brenan - from Ivory Coast to Tanzania
- Floscopa elegans Huber - Ecuador, Peru, northwestern Brazil
- Floscopa flavida C.B.Clarke - from Senegal to Tanzania and south to Botswana
- Floscopa glabrata (Kunth) Hassk. - Brazil, Paraguay, Argentina, Bolivia, Colombia, Costa Rica; naturalized in Vietnam
- Floscopa glomerata (Willd. ex Schult. & Schult.f.) Hassk. - most of sub-Saharan Africa; Madagascar
- Floscopa gossweileri Cavaco - Angola
- Floscopa leiothyrsa Brenan - Mali, Chad, Zaïre, Tanzania, Zambia, Botswana
- Floscopa mannii C.B.Clarke - from Nigeria to Zaïre
- Floscopa perforans Rusby - Bolivia
- Floscopa peruviana Hassk. ex C.B.Clarke - Bolivia, Peru, Ecuador, Venezuela, Suriname, French Guinea
- Floscopa polypleura Brenan - Ghana, Tanzania, Zambia
- Floscopa rivularioides T.C.E.Fr. - Zimbabwe
- Floscopa robusta (Seub.) C.B.Clarke - Brazil, Colombia, Ecuador, Peru, Central America
- Floscopa scandens Lour. - China, Indian Subcontinent, Andaman & Nicobar Islands, Indochina, Malaysia, western Indonesia, Philippines, Queensland
- Floscopa schweinfurthii C.B.Clarke - Tanzania
- Floscopa tanneri Brenan - Zaïre, Tanzania
- Floscopa yunnanensis D.Y.Hong - Yunnan Province in China
