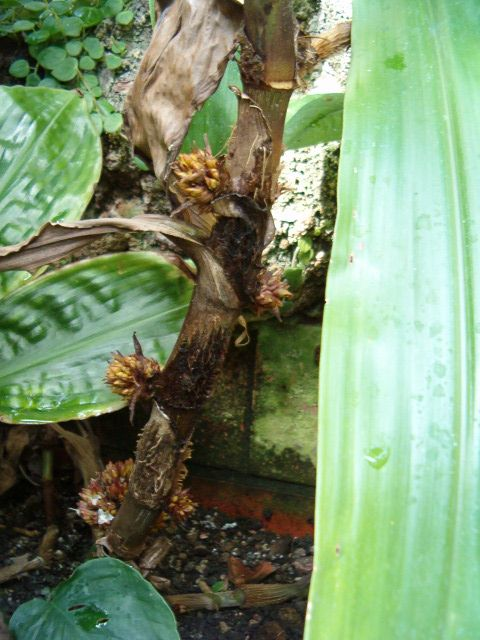
- Amischotolype monosperma in cultivation at the Botanical Garden in Berlin

Scientific classification
- Kingdom: Plantae
- Clade: Tracheophytes
- Clade: Angiosperms
- Clade: Monocots
- Clade: Commelinids
- Order: Commelinales
- Family: Commelinaceae
- Subfamily: Commelinoideae
- Tribe: Tradescantieae
- Subtribe: Coleotrypinae
- Genus: Amischotolype; Hassk. (1863)

Type species
- Amischotolype glabrata Hassk.

Synonyms
- Forrestia A.Rich. 1834 not Raf. 1806; Porandra D.Y.Hong (1974)

= Amischotolype =

Genus of flowering plants

Amischotolype is a genus of perennial monocotyledonous flowering plants in the Commelinaceae. It is found in Central Africa and from India through Southeast Asia to New Guinea, with the great majority or species found in Asia.

The name is derived from the Ancient Greek words αμισχος, meaning 'unstalked', and τολυπη, meaning 'tangle'. The genus is characterised by its rather compact inflorescences which are composed on two or more cincinni that pierce through the base of the leaf sheath, and also by its seeds that are embedded in red arils. Flowers are actinomorphic, and anthers release their pollen either through a pore at the tip or slits down the sides. They are typically encountered in forest understories. The genus Porandra, which consists of three Asian species, is considered by Robert Faden, a leading authority on the family, to be "doubtfully distinct" from Amischotolype, and Plants of the World Online considers it a synonym. Analysis of DNA sequences has shown that Amischotolype is most closely related to the genus Coleotrype, while these two are in turn most closely related to the genus Cyanotis plus its synonym Belosynapsis. These four genera form a clade that is found only in the Old World, while all of its immediate ancestors are present only in the New World.

== Species ==
28 species are accepted.

- Amischotolype balslevii Boonsuk, Chantar. & Kantachot – Laos and Thailand
- Amischotolype barbarossa Duist. - Myanmar, Thailand, Sumatra
- Amischotolype divaricata Duist. - Indochina, Sumatra
- Amischotolype dolichandra Duist. - Assam
- Amischotolype glabrata Hassk. - Himalayas, southern China, Tibet, Indochina, Andaman & Nicobar Islands, western Indonesia
- Amischotolype gracilis (Ridl.) I.M.Turner - Borneo, Malaya, Sumatra
- Amischotolype griffithii (C.B.Clarke) I.M.Turner - Malaya, Riau Islands
- Amischotolype hirsuta (Hallier f.) Duist. - Borneo, Sumatra
- Amischotolype hispida (A.Rich.) D.Y.Hong - Borneo, Sulawesi, Philippines, Maluku, New Guinea
- Amischotolype hookeri (Hassk.) H.Hara - Nepal, Bangladesh, Assam, Bhutan, Arunachal Pradesh
- Amischotolype irritans (Ridl.) I.M.Turner - Thailand, Sumatra, Malaya
- Amischotolype laxiflora (Merr.) Faden - Borneo, Sulawesi
- Amischotolype leiocarpa (Hallier f.) Duist. - Borneo
- Amischotolype lobata Duist. - Borneo
- Amischotolype marginata (Blume) Hassk - Myanmar, Thailand, Malaysia, Indonesia, Philippines
- Amischotolype microphylla (Y.Wan) C.K.Lee, Fuse & M.N.Tamura – southern Myanmar to western and central Malesia
- Amischotolype mollissima (Blume) Hassk - Java, Sumatra
- Amischotolype monosperma (C.B.Clarke) I.M.Turner - Myanmar, Thailand, Malaysia, Borneo
- Amischotolype neoscandens Idrees – Indochina and southern Yunnan
- Amischotolype parvifructa Duist. - Cameron Highlands of Malaysia
- Amischotolype pedicellata Duist. - Borneo
- Amischotolype ramosa (D.Y.Hong) C.K.Lee, Fuse & M.N.Tamura – southern China and Thailand
- Amischotolype rostrata (Hassk.) Duist. - Java, Sumatra, Maluku
- Amischotolype scandens Burg & E.Bidault – Gabon
- Amischotolype sphagnorrhiza Cowley - Brunei, Sarawak
- Amischotolype strigosa Duist. - Sumatra
- Amischotolype tenuis (C.B.Clarke) R.S.Rao - Nigeria, Cameroon, Gabon, Congo-Brazzaville, Equatorial Guinea, Central African Republic, Zaire
- Amischotolype welzeniana Duist. - Myanmar, Thailand
