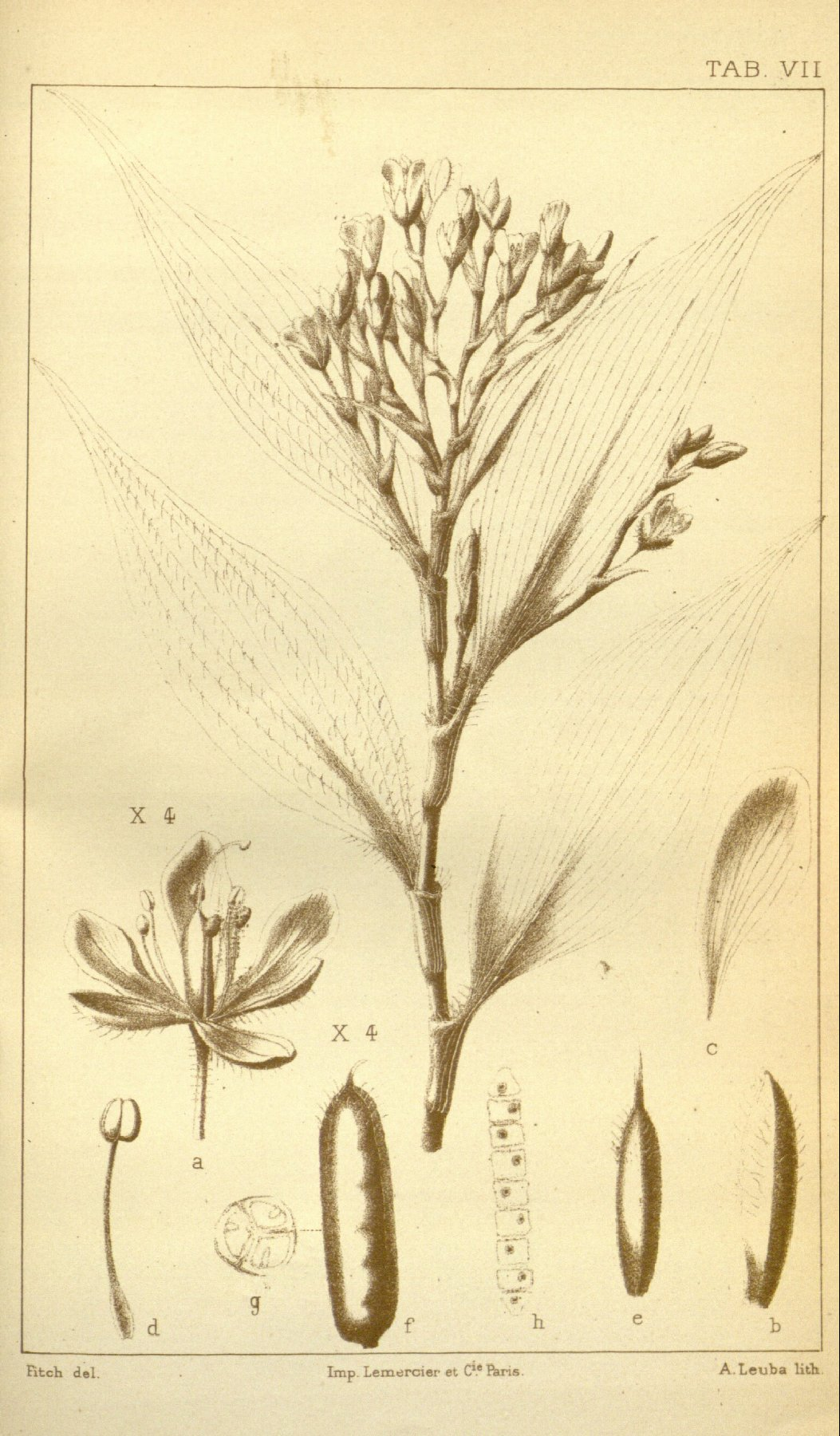
- Stanfieldiella imperforata

Scientific classification
- Kingdom: Plantae
- Clade: Tracheophytes
- Clade: Angiosperms
- Clade: Monocots
- Clade: Commelinids
- Order: Commelinales
- Family: Commelinaceae
- Subfamily: Commelinoideae
- Tribe: Commelineae
- Genus: Stanfieldiella; Brenan

= Stanfieldiella =

Genus of plants

Stanfieldiella is genus of flowering plants within the family Commelinaceae, first described in 1960. It is native to sub-Saharan Africa.

Species

- Stanfieldiella axillaris J.K.Morton - Ghana, Nigeria
- Stanfieldiella brachycarpa (Gilg & Ledermann ex Mildbr.) Brenan - from Nigeria to Congo
- Stanfieldiella imperforata (C.B.Clarke) Brenan - from Liberia to Ghana; also Angola
- Stanfieldiella oligantha (Mildbr.) Brenan - from Liberia to Gabon

== References and external links ==
- Data related to Stanfieldiella at Wikispecies
- Media related to Stanfieldiella at Wikimedia Commons
