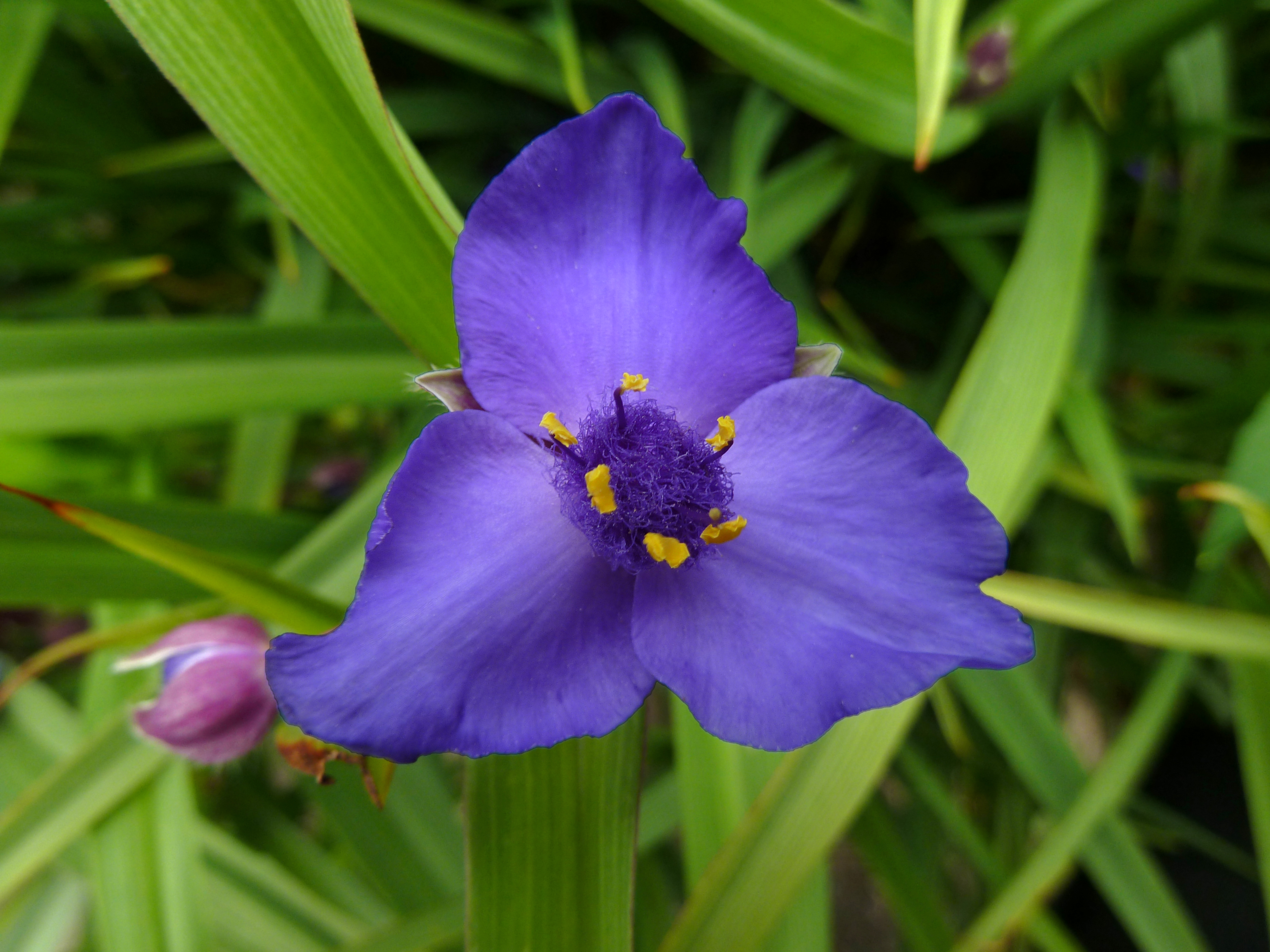
- Tradescantia virginiana

Scientific classification
- Kingdom: Plantae
- Clade: Tracheophytes
- Clade: Angiosperms
- Clade: Monocots
- Clade: Commelinids
- Order: Commelinales
- Family: Commelinaceae
- Subfamily: Commelinoideae
- Tribe: Tradescantieae; Meisn.

= Tradescantieae =

Tribe of plants

The Tradescantieae are a tribe of plants in the family Commelinaceae erected by Carl Meissner in 1842. Many genera originate from the Americas, but those in subtribes Coleotrypinae, Cyanotinae, Palisotinae and Streptoliriinae are Asian or African in origin; several species in the typical Tradescantia and other genera have become domesticated ornamental plants and naturalised elsewhere.

== Subtribes and genera ==
The following subtribes remain included, but in their review Zuntini et al. (2021) question their functionality:

=== Coleotrypinae ===
1. Amischotolype Hassk.
2. Coleotrype C. B. Clarke
3. Porandra D. Y. Hong

=== Cyanotinae ===
1. Belosynapsis Hassk.
2. Cyanotis D. Don

=== Dichorisandrinae ===
1. Cochliostema Lem.
2. Dichorisandra J. C. Mikan
3. Geogenanthus Ule
4. Plowmanianthus Faden & C. R. Hardy
5. Siderasis Raf.

=== Palisotinae ===
1. Palisota Rchb.

=== Streptoliriinae ===
1. Aetheolirion Forman
2. Spatholirion Ridl.
3. Streptolirion Edgew.

=== Thyrsantheminae ===
1. Gibasoides D. R. Hunt
2. Matudanthus D. R. Hunt
3. Thyrsanthemum Pichon
4. Tinantia Scheidw.
5. Weldenia Schult. f.

=== Tradescantiinae ===
1. Callisia Loefl.
2. Elasis D. R. Hunt
3. Gibasis Raf.
4. Tradescantia L.
5. Tripogandra Raf.
