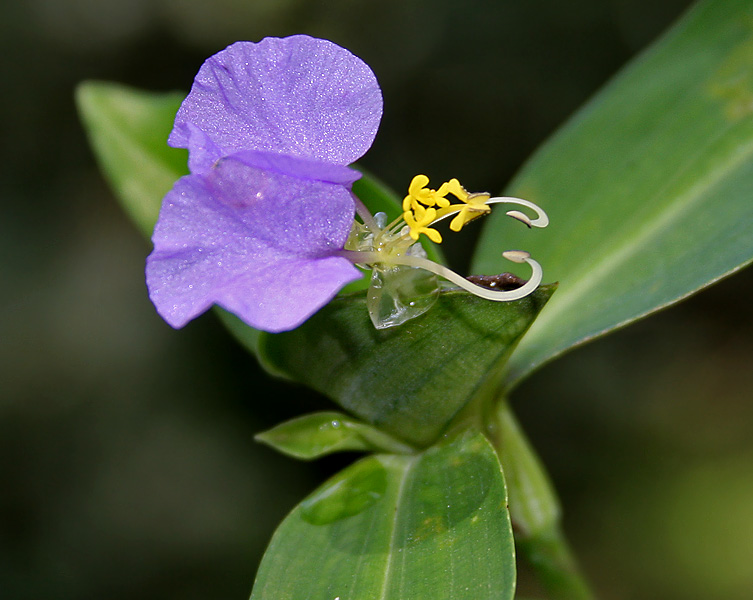
- Commelina maculata in Narsapur, Medak district, India.

Scientific classification
- Kingdom: Plantae
- Clade: Tracheophytes
- Clade: Angiosperms
- Clade: Monocots
- Clade: Commelinids
- Order: Commelinales
- Family: Commelinaceae
- Subfamily: Commelinoideae; Faden & D.R. Hunt

Tribes
- Tradescantieae; Commelineae

= Commelinoideae =

Subfamily of flowering plants

Commelinoideae is a subfamily of monocotyledonous plants in the dayflower family (Commelinaceae). It is one of two subfamilies within the Commelinaceae and includes 39 genera (out of 41 in the family) and all but 12 of the family's several hundred known species. The subfamily is further broken down into two tribes, the Tradescantieae, which includes 26 genera and about 300 species, and the Commelineae, which contains 13 genera and about 350 species.

The Commelinoideae is separated morphologically from the other subfamily, Cartonematoideae, in having glandular microhairs, arteries containing needle-like calcium oxalate crystals called raphide canals in between the veins of the leaves, and flowers that are virtually never both yellow and actinomorphic. Molecular phylogenetics also supports the separation of the two subfamilies.

== Phylogeny ==
The following is a phylogeny, or evolutionary tree, of most of the genera in Commelinoideae based on DNA sequences from the plastid gene rbcL

- - Subfamily Commelinoideae
    - Tribe Tradescantieae
      - Tinantia
      - - Weldenia
        - Thyrsanthemum
      - - Elasis
        - Tradescantia + Gibasis
        - Callisia + Tripogandra
      - - - Amischotolype
          - Coleotrype
        - - Cyanotis
          - Belosynapsis
      - - Dichorisandra
        - Siderasis
      - Cochliostema
      - Plowmanianthus
      - Geogenanthus
      - Palisota
      - Spatholirion
    - Tribe Commelineae
      - - Commelina
        - Pollia
        - Polyspatha
        - Aneilema + Rhopalephora
      - - Floscopa
        - Stanfieldiella
      - Buforrestia
      - - Murdannia
        - Anthericopsis

== Bibliography ==
- Jean H. Burns, Robert B. Faden, and Scott J. Steppan. (2011) Phylogenetic Studies in the Commelinaceae Subfamily Commelinoideae Inferred from Nuclear Ribosomal and Chloroplast DNA Sequences. Systematic Botany 36(2): 268–276. doi:10.1600/036364411X569471
- Media related to Commelinoideae at Wikimedia Commons
