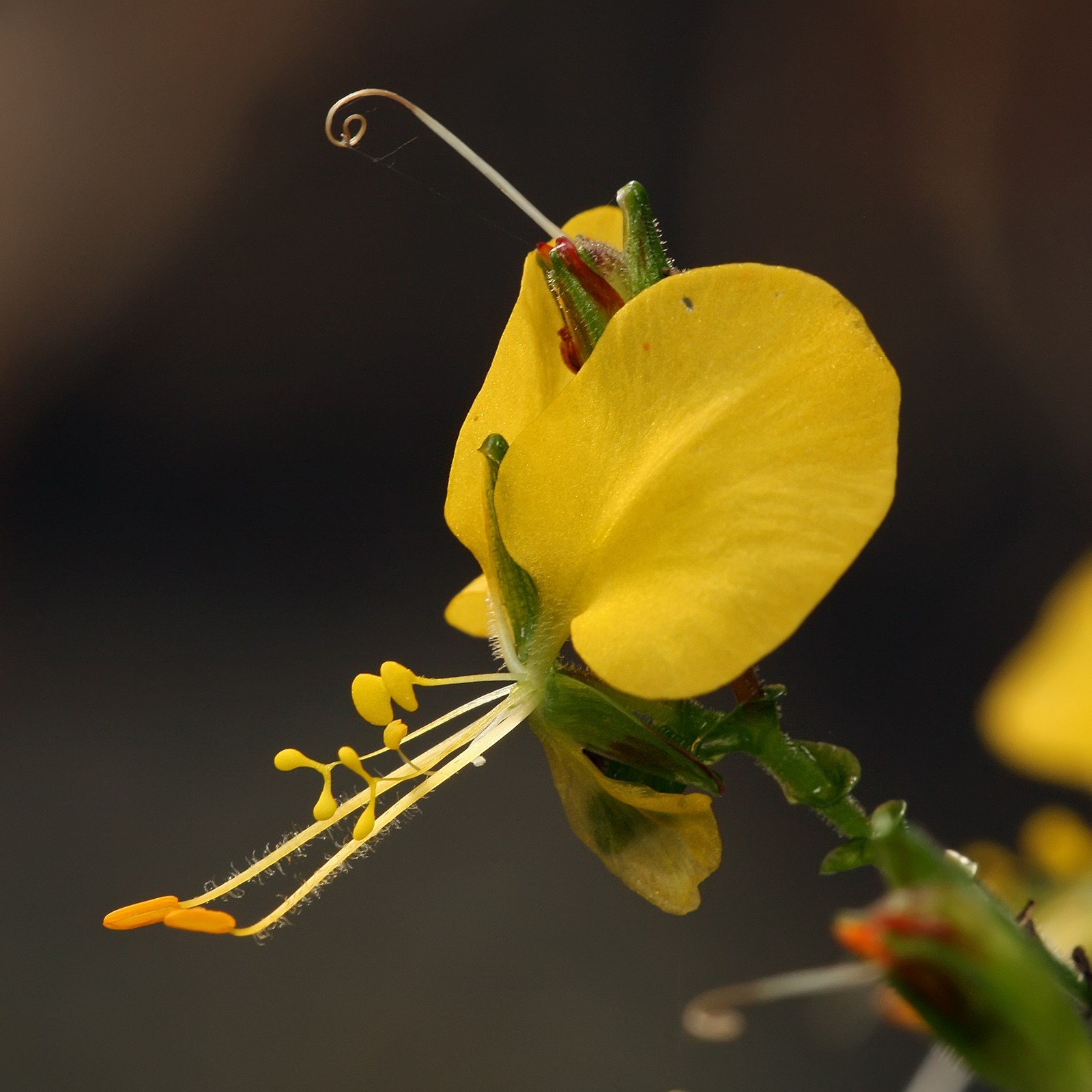
- Aneilema aequinoctiale

Scientific classification
- Kingdom: Plantae
- Clade: Tracheophytes
- Clade: Angiosperms
- Clade: Monocots
- Clade: Commelinids
- Order: Commelinales
- Family: Commelinaceae; Mirb.

Genera
- see List of Commelinaceae genera

= Commelinaceae =

Family of flowering plants

Commelinaceae is a family of flowering plants. In less formal contexts, the group is referred to as the dayflower family or spiderwort family. It is one of five families in the order Commelinales and by far the largest of these with about 731 known species in 41 genera. Well known genera include Commelina (dayflowers) and Tradescantia (spiderworts). The family is diverse in both the Old World tropics and the New World tropics, with some genera present in both. The variation in morphology, especially that of the flower and inflorescence, is considered to be exceptionally high amongst the angiosperms.

The family has always been recognized by most taxonomists. The APG III system of 2009 (unchanged from the APG system of 1998), also recognizes this family, and assigns it to the order Commelinales in the clade commelinids in the monocots. The family counts several hundred species of herbaceous plants. Many are cultivated as ornamentals. The stems of these plants are generally well-developed, and often swollen at the nodes. Flowers are often short-lived, lasting for a day or less.

The flowers of Commelinaceae are ephemeral, lack nectar, and offer only pollen as a reward to their pollinators. Most species are hermaphroditic, meaning each flower contains male and female organs, or andromonoecious, meaning that both bisexual and male flowers occur on the same plant. Floral dimorphism may be accompanied by variable pedicel length, filament length and/or curvature, or stamen number and/or position. Species tend to have specific flowering seasons, though local environmental factors tend to effect exact timing, sometimes considerably. Species tend to flower at a specific time of day as well, with these periods being well defined enough to presumably isolate different species reproductively. Furthermore, some species exhibit differential opening times for male and bisexual flowers. Commelinaceae flowers tend to deceive pollinators by appearing to offer a larger reward than is actually present. This is accomplished with various adaptations such as yellow hairs or broad anther connectives that mimic pollen, or staminodes that lack pollen but appear like fertile stamens.

== Description ==
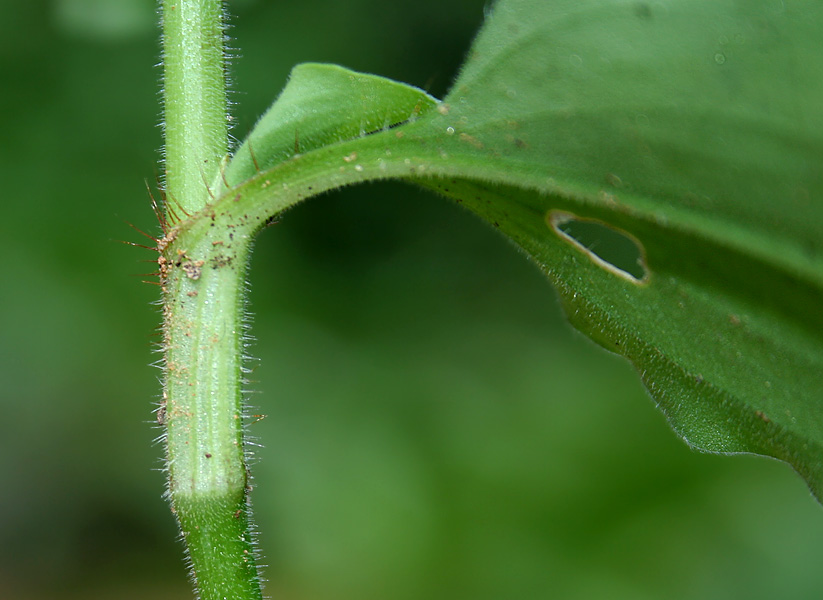
The distinctive leaf sheath common to all Commelinaceae

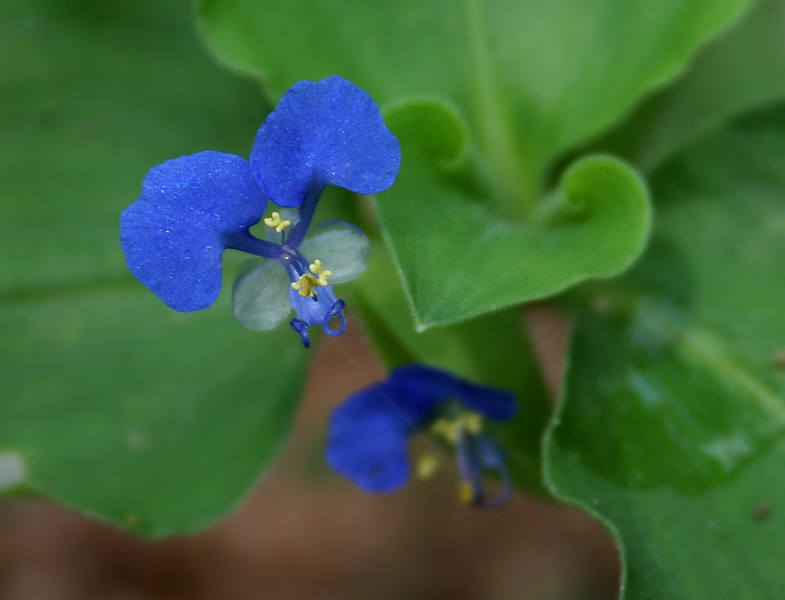
The distinctive involute unfurling of the leaf in most Commelinaceae can be seen in the background; also note the clawed petals, polymorphic stamens, and dimorphic petals in this species

Plants in the Commelinaceae are usually perennials, but a smaller number of species are annuals. They are always terrestrial except for plants in the genus Cochliostema, which are epiphytes. Plants typically have an erect or scrambling but ascending habit, often spreading by rooting at the nodes or by stolons. Some have rhizomes, and the genera Streptolirion, Aetheolirion, and some species of Spatholirion are climbers. The roots are either fibrous or form tubers.

Leaves form sheaths at their bases that surround the stem, much like the leaves of grasses, except that the sheaths are closed and do not have a ligule. The leaves alternate up the stem and may be two-ranked or spirally arranged. The leaf blades are simple and entire (that is, they lack any teeth or lobes), they sometimes narrow at the base, and they are often succulent. The way in which the leaves typically unfurl from bud is a distinctive feature of the family: it is termed involute, and means that the margins at the leaf base are rolled in when they first emerge. However, some groups are supervolute or convolute.

The inflorescences occur either as a terminal shoot at the top of the plant, or as terminal and axillary shoots arising from lower nodes, or rarely as only axillary shoots that pierce through the leaf sheath such as in Coleotrype and Amischotolype. The inflorescence is classed as a thyrse, and each subunit is made up of cincinni; this basically means that flowers are grouped in scorpion's tail-like clusters along a central axis, although this basic ground plan can become highly modified or reduced. Inflorescences or their subunit are sometimes enclosed in a leaf-like bract often called a spathe.

Flowers can have either one or many planes of symmetry; that is either zygomorphic or actinomorphic. They remain open for only a few hours after opening, after which they deliquesce. The flowers are usually all bisexual (hermaphrodite), but some species have both male and bisexual flowers (andromonoecious), the single species Callisia repens has bisexual and female flowers (gynomonoecious), and some have bisexual, male, and female flowers (polygamomonoecious). Nectaries are not found in any species within the family. There are always three sepals, although they may be equal or unequal, unfused or basally fused, petal-like or green. Likewise, there are always three petals, but these may be equal or in two forms, free or basally fused, white or coloured. The petals are sometimes clawed, meaning they narrow to stalk at the base where they attach to the rest of the flower. There are almost always six stamens in two whorls, but these occur in a myriad of arrangements and forms. They may be all fertile and equal or unequal, but in many genera two to four are staminodes (i.e. infertile, non-pollen producing stamens). Staminodes can alternate with the fertile stamens or they can all occur in the upper or lower hemisphere of the flower. The stalks of the stamens are bearded in many genera, although in some of these only some are bearded while others are hairless. Sometimes one to three stamens are absent altogether. Pollen is usually released from slits that open on the sides of the anthers from top to bottom, but some species have pores that open at the tips.

== Phylogeny ==
The Commelinaceae is a well supported monophyletic group according to the analysis of Burns et al. (2011). The following is a phylogeny, or evolutionary tree, of most of the genera in Commelinaceae based on DNA sequences from the plastid gene rbcL

- Family Commelinaceae
  - Subfamily Cartonematoideae
    Cartonema
  - Subfamily Commelinoideae
    - Tribe Tradescantieae
      - Tinantia
      - - Weldenia
        - Thyrsanthemum
      - - Elasis
        - Tradescantia + Gibasis
        - Callisia + Tripogandra
      - - - Amischotolype
          - Coleotrype
        - - Cyanotis
          - Belosynapsis
      - - Dichorisandra
        - Siderasis
      - Cochliostema
      - Plowmanianthus
      - Geogenanthus
      - Palisota
      - Spatholirion
    - Tribe Commelineae
      - - Commelina
        - Pollia
        - Polyspatha
        - Aneilema + Rhopalephora
      - - Floscopa
        - Stanfieldiella
      - Buforrestia
      - - Murdannia
        - Anthericopsis

All clades shown have 80% bootstrap support or better.

== See also ==
- List of foliage plant diseases (Commelinaceae)
