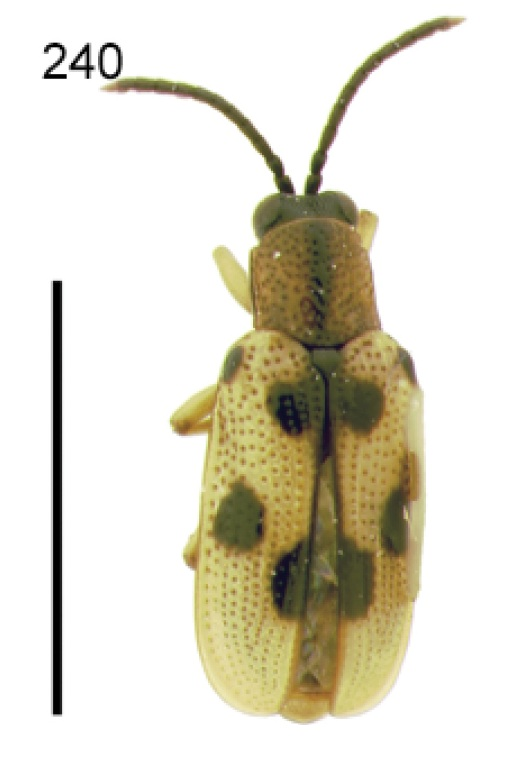

Scientific classification
- Kingdom: Animalia
- Phylum: Arthropoda
- Class: Insecta
- Order: Coleoptera
- Suborder: Polyphaga
- Infraorder: Cucujiformia
- Family: Chrysomelidae
- Genus: Cephaloleia
- Species: C. stevensi

Binomial name
- Cephaloleia stevensi Baly, 1885

= Cephaloleia stevensi =

Species of beetle

Cephaloleia stevensi is a species of beetle of the family Chrysomelidae. It is found in Costa Rica and Panama.

== Description ==
Adults reach a length of about 3.4–3.8 mm. The head and legs are reddish-brown. Antennomeres 1–2 are reddish-brown, while the rest is darker. The pronotum is yellow with variable black markings and the elytron is yellow with variable black oblong markings.

== Biology ==
Adults have been collected on the leaves of Heliconia species, as well as on Calathea micans, Cephaloleia inocephala, Cephaloleia latifolia, Pleiostachya pruinosa, Calathea venusta and Tradescantia zanonia.
