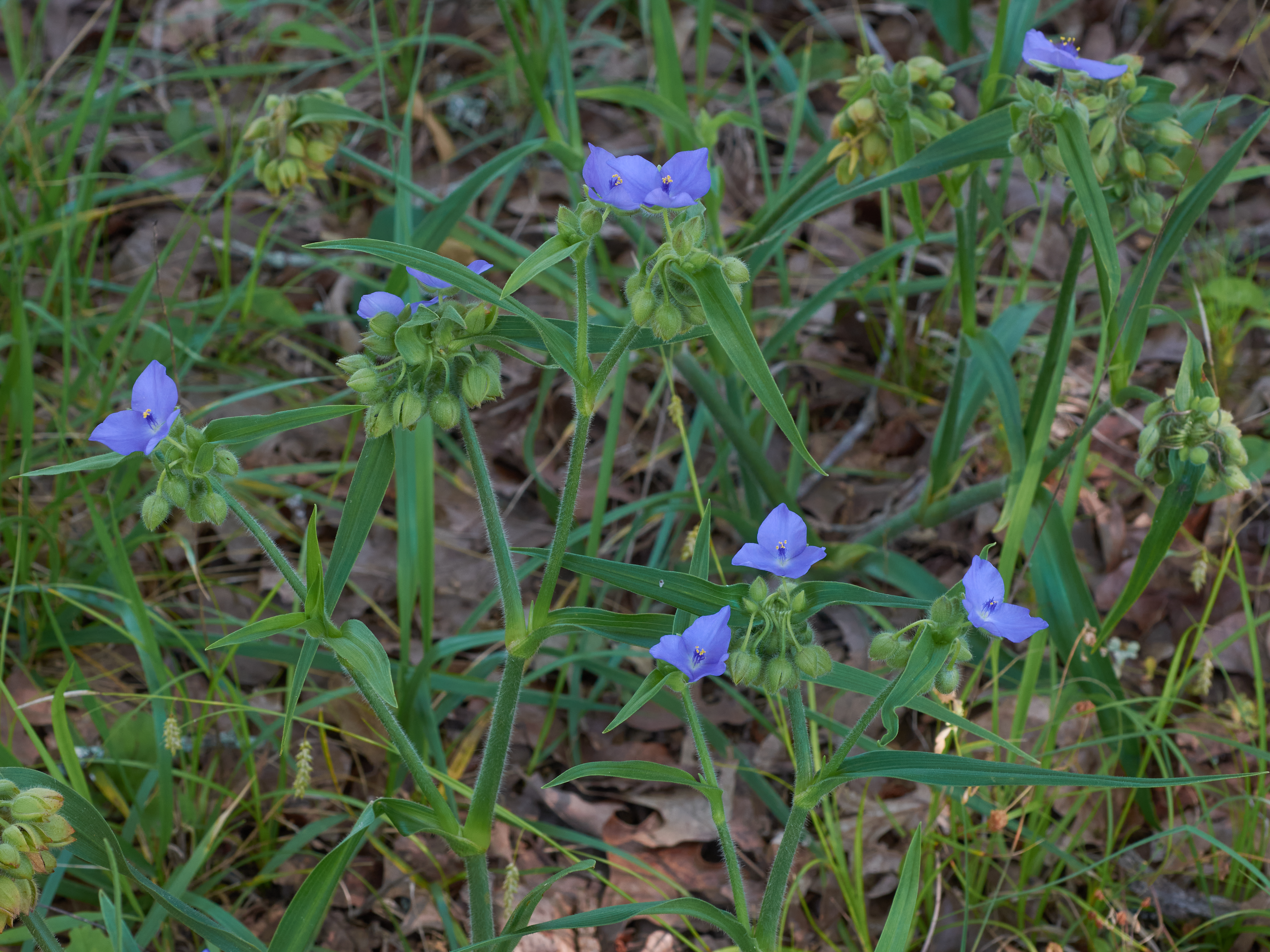

Scientific classification
- Kingdom: Plantae
- Clade: Tracheophytes
- Clade: Angiosperms
- Clade: Monocots
- Clade: Commelinids
- Order: Commelinales
- Family: Commelinaceae
- Genus: Tradescantia
- Species: T. hirsutiflora

Binomial name
- Tradescantia hirsutiflora Bush

= Tradescantia hirsutiflora =

Species of flowering plant

Tradescantia hirsutiflora, commonly called hairyflower spiderwort, is a species of plant in the spiderwort family that is native to the south-central United States of America.
