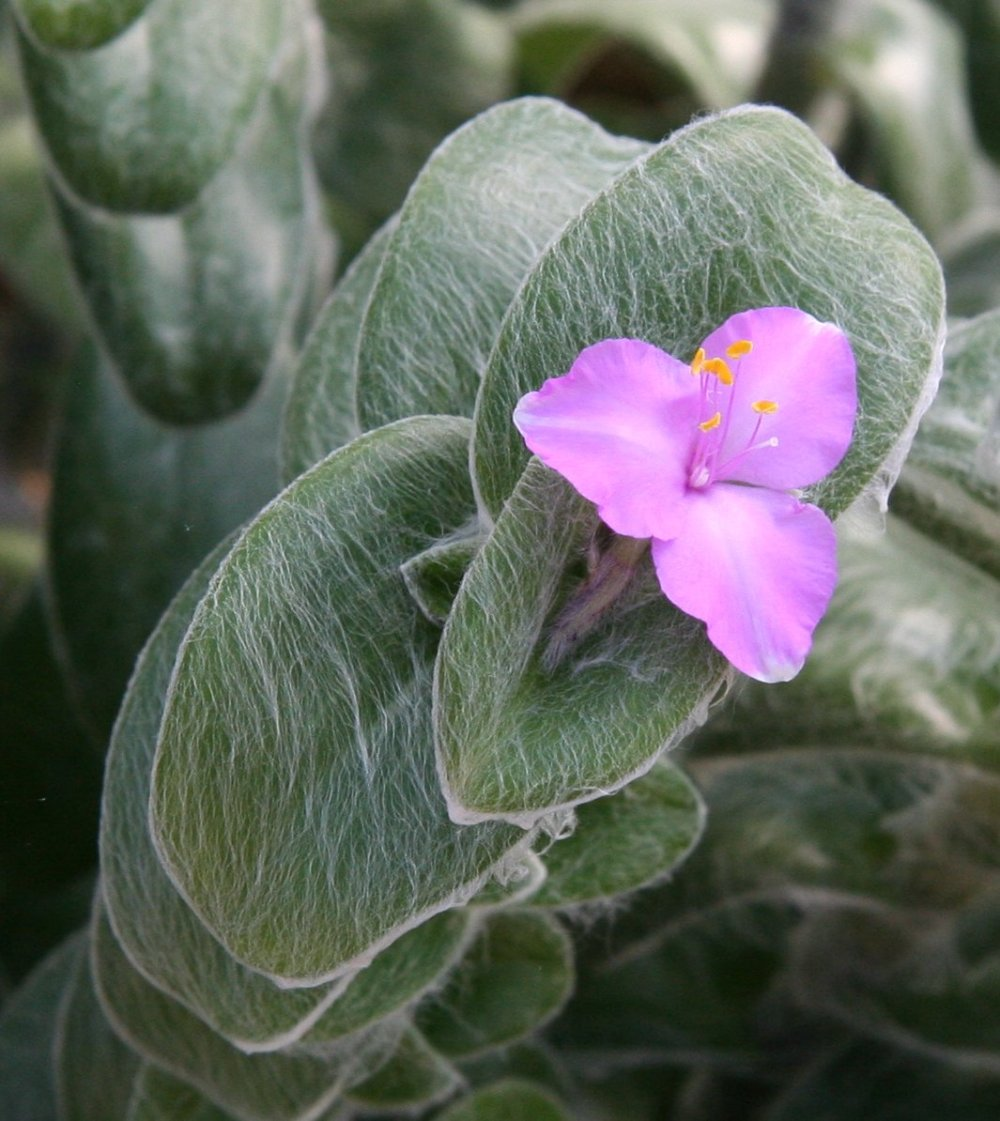

Scientific classification
- Kingdom: Plantae
- Clade: Embryophytes
- Clade: Tracheophytes
- Clade: Spermatophytes
- Clade: Angiosperms
- Clade: Monocots
- Clade: Commelinids
- Order: Commelinales
- Family: Commelinaceae
- Genus: Tradescantia
- Species: T. sillamontana

Binomial name
- Tradescantia sillamontana Matuda

Synonyms
- Tradescantia pexata H. E. Moore

= Tradescantia sillamontana =

Species of flowering plant

Tradescantia sillamontana is a perennial evergreen herbaceous plant of the genus Tradescantia. This species is one of the most succulent and xerophytic species of Tradescantia. It is endemic to dry areas of the State of Nuevo León in northeastern Mexico and can also be found in Spain and Italy.

== Description ==
T. sillamontana has a recognizable and distinctive appearance. The leaves are arranged in a precise geometric shape. Almost completely white hairs cover all parts of the plant: leaves, shoots, and even the buds. These protect the plant from direct sunlight and excessive evaporation. Shoots and stems reach a height of 30–40 cm, first erect, later prostrate and rooting at the soil surface. The leaves are fleshy, ovate, 3–7 cm long, covered with grayish-white short hairs. During the summer, the flowers appear at apical growth points or in the axils of the bracts; these are typical Tradescantia flowers. The corolla consists of three bright purplish-pink to purple petals and three small sepals.

== Cultivation ==
Tradescantia sillamontana is almost as easy to grow as other species of the genus Tradescantia. However, unlike most species of Tradescantia, this species is almost succulent and nearly xerophytic. T. sillamontana should be grown in a well lit position, although direct summer sun can cause burns, so gradual acclimatization is needed. While it is native to arid areas of Mexico, it does best with roughly 750 mm (30 in) of water per year. It will go dormant in cooler desert winters.

Flowering in summer is quite abundant, if well-cultivated. The plant quickly loses its desirable appearance with excessive watering, too dark a location, and an excess of nitrogen. Spraying the leaves is not recommended at all. Soil should allow good drainage, with at least a third to a half made up of coarse sand and gravel. Moderate watering is required during the growing season; the plant should be kept almost dry in winter maintenance. The minimum temperature during the period of dormancy is 10 °C. The plant can be divided in Spring, with any shoots which are too long being trimmed.

In the subtropical zone this is one of the most popular garden plants. In Europe it is sometimes cultivated in gardens and rock gardens, but in the winter it is brought into a cool greenhouse or protected from cold and moisture with a temporary shelter. Reproduction is easy by cuttings 5–8 cm long, rooted in sandy soil, or by dividing and transplanting the bush.

Tradescantia sillamontana has won the Royal Horticultural Society's Award of Garden Merit.
