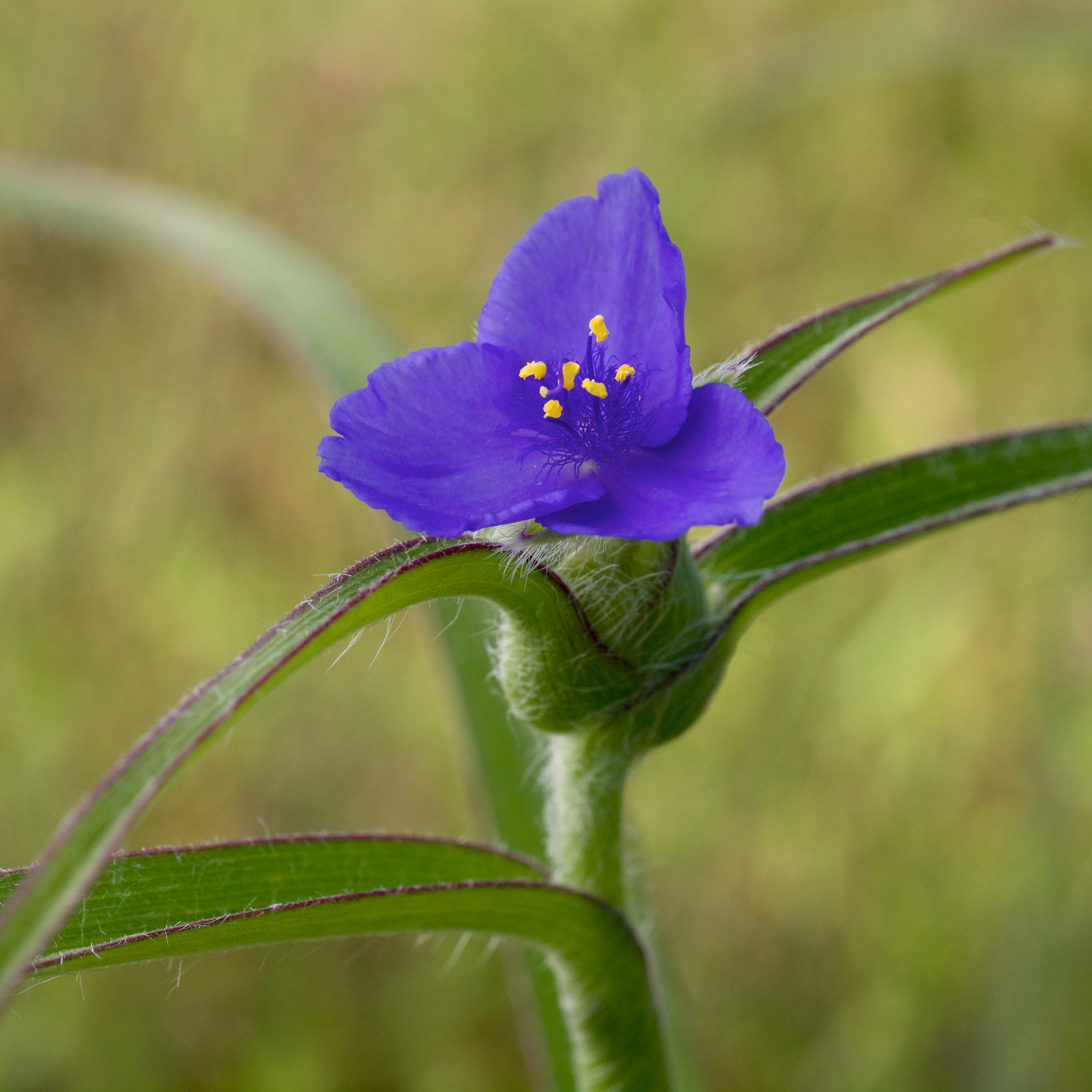

Scientific classification
- Kingdom: Plantae
- Clade: Tracheophytes
- Clade: Angiosperms
- Clade: Monocots
- Clade: Commelinids
- Order: Commelinales
- Family: Commelinaceae
- Genus: Tradescantia
- Species: T. reverchonii

Binomial name
- Tradescantia reverchonii (Bush)

= Tradescantia reverchonii =

Species of flowering plant

Tradescantia reverchonii, commonly called Reverchon's spiderwort, is a species of plant in the dayflower family that is native to central and eastern Texas, western Louisiana and southwestern Arkansas in the United States.

It is a perennial that produces purple or blue flowers in the spring on herbaceous stems.
