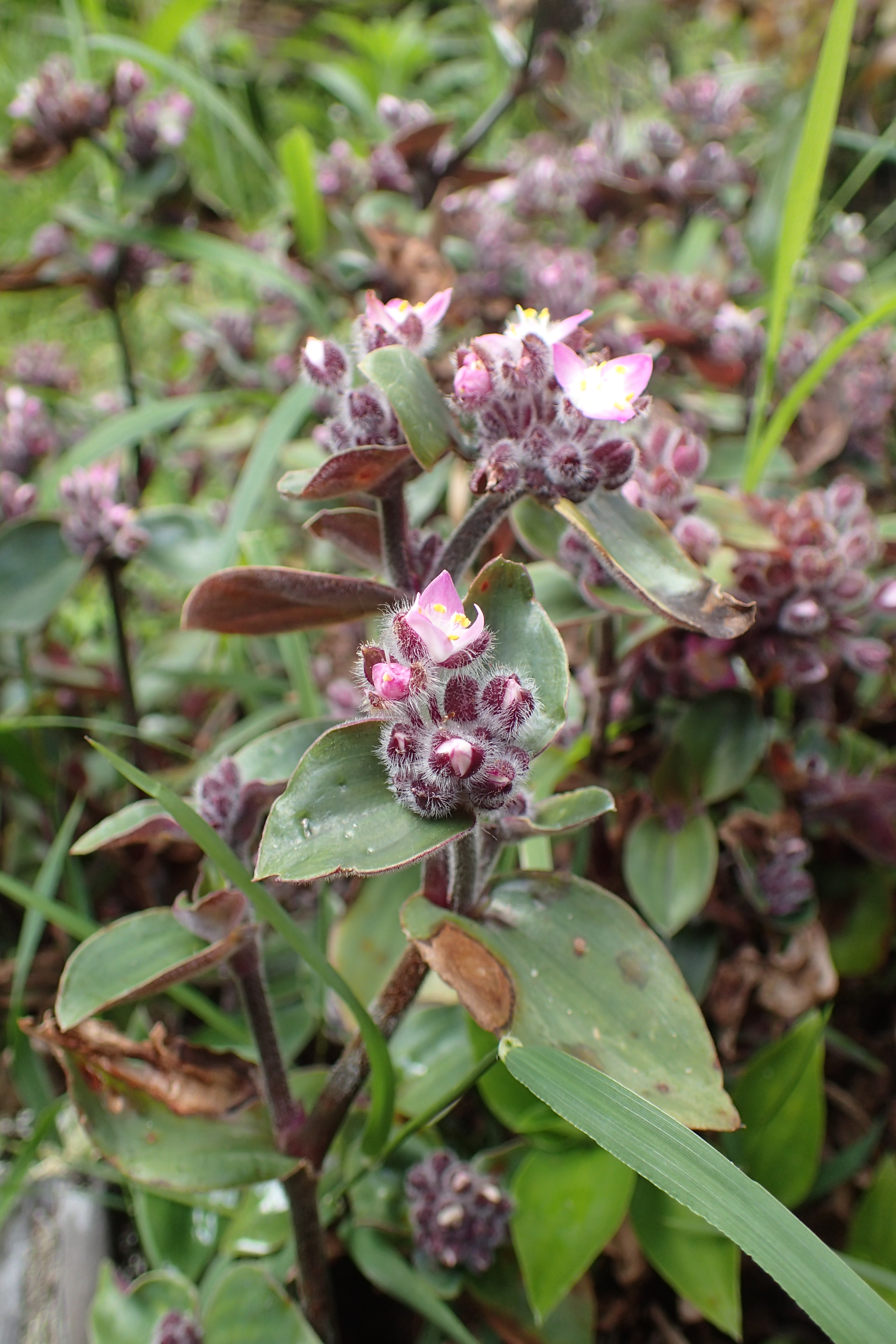

Scientific classification
- Kingdom: Plantae
- Clade: Tracheophytes
- Clade: Angiosperms
- Clade: Monocots
- Clade: Commelinids
- Order: Commelinales
- Family: Commelinaceae
- Genus: Tradescantia
- Species: T. cerinthoides

Binomial name
- Tradescantia cerinthoides Kunth

Synonyms
- Tradescantia blossfeldiana Mildbr.

= Tradescantia cerinthoides =

Species of flowering plant

Tradescantia cerinthoides, commonly called flowering inch plant, is a species of plant in the family Commelinaceae that is native to south east Brazil to north east Argentina. Described in 1843 by the German botanist, Carl Sigismund Kunth. The pink tipped white flowers and green purplish foliage are appealing features to gardeners. This plant is used in many parts of the world as an ornamental, and can become an invasive species.
