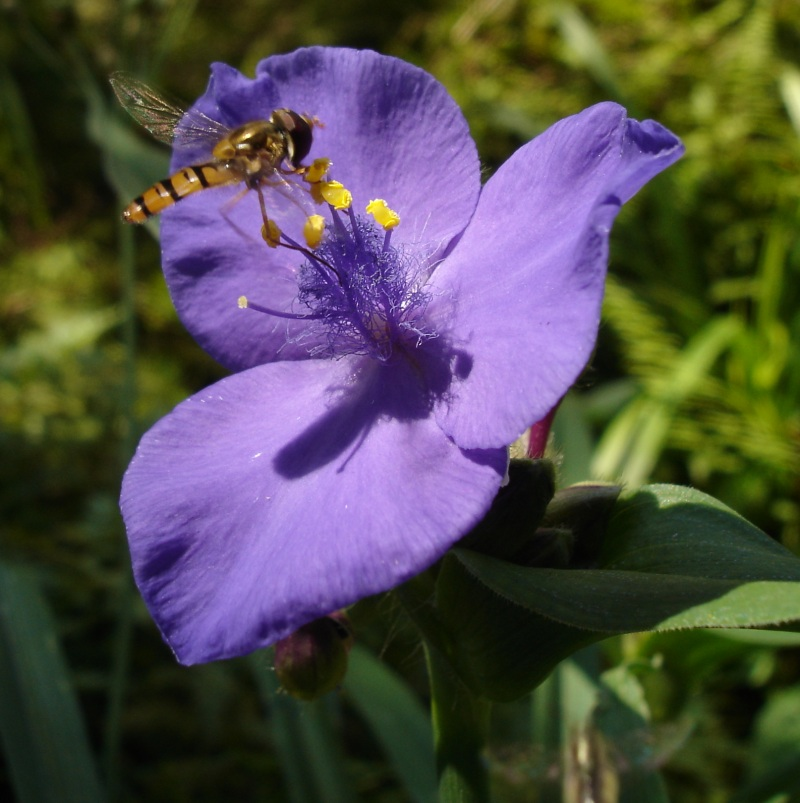

Scientific classification
- Kingdom: Plantae
- Clade: Tracheophytes
- Clade: Angiosperms
- Clade: Monocots
- Clade: Commelinids
- Order: Commelinales
- Family: Commelinaceae
- Subfamily: Commelinoideae
- Tribe: Tradescantieae
- Subtribe: Tradescantiinae
- Genus: Tradescantia
- Species: T. humilis

Binomial name
- Tradescantia humilis Rose

= Tradescantia humilis =

Species of flowering plant

Tradescantia humilis, the Texas spiderwort, is a species of Tradescantia native to Texas and southern Oklahoma. It was named after John Tradescant (1608–1662) who served as gardener to Charles I of England. It was described by US botanist Joseph Nelson Rose in 1899.
