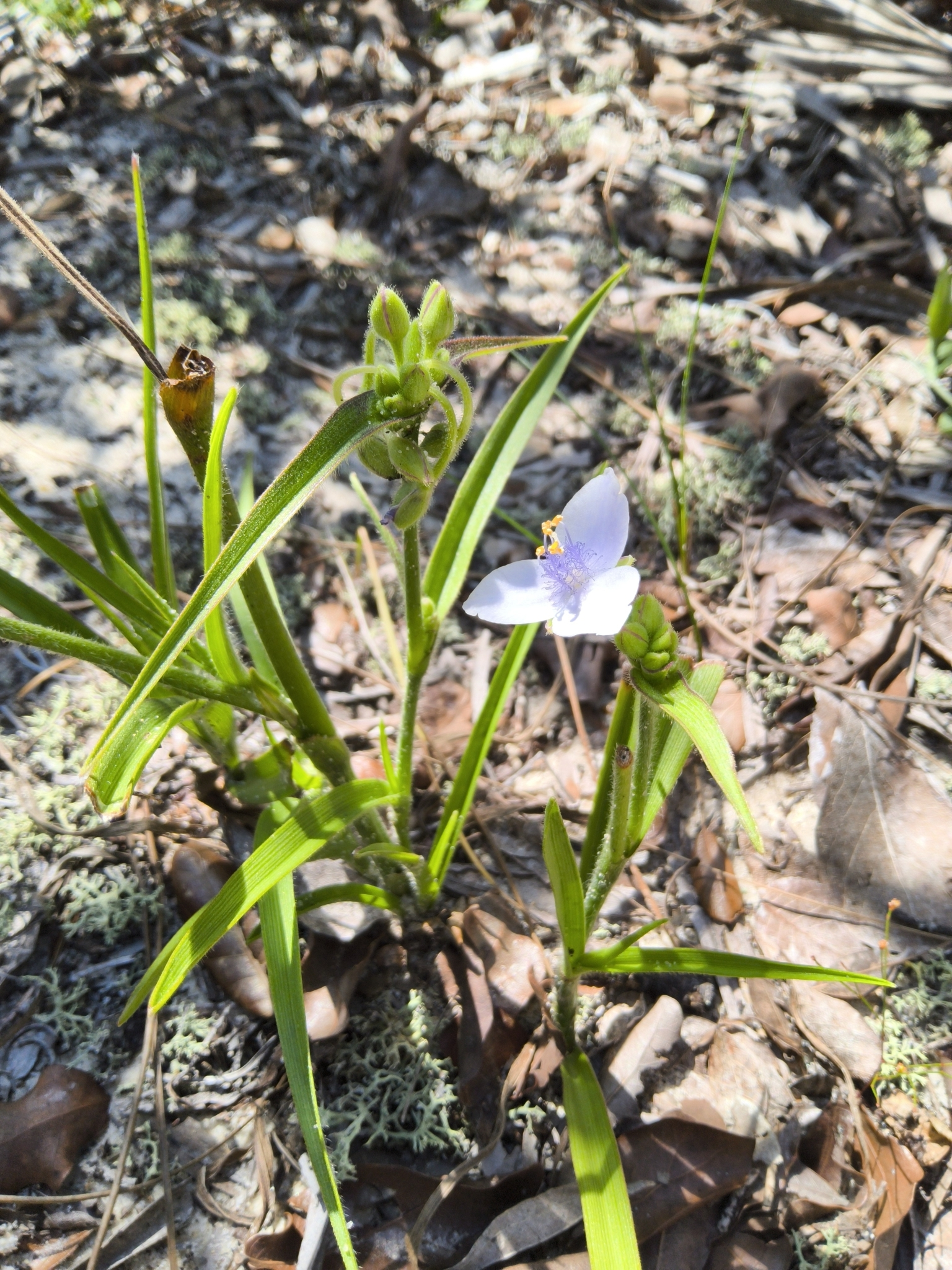
- Specimen growing in yellow sand Florida scrub

Conservation status
- Vulnerable (NatureServe)

Scientific classification
- Kingdom: Plantae
- Clade: Tracheophytes
- Clade: Angiosperms
- Clade: Monocots
- Clade: Commelinids
- Order: Commelinales
- Family: Commelinaceae
- Genus: Tradescantia
- Species: T. roseolens

Binomial name
- Tradescantia roseolens Small

= Tradescantia roseolens =

Species of flowering plant

Tradescantia roseolens, commonly called longleaf spiderwort, sandhill spiderwort, or rosy spiderwort, is a threatened perennial herb endemic to the U.S. southeast coastal plain in the states of Florida, Georgia, South Carolina, and Alabama.

== Habitat ==
It occurs in the sandy, acidic soils of the fire-dependent habitats of the southeast including sandhill and Florida scrub.

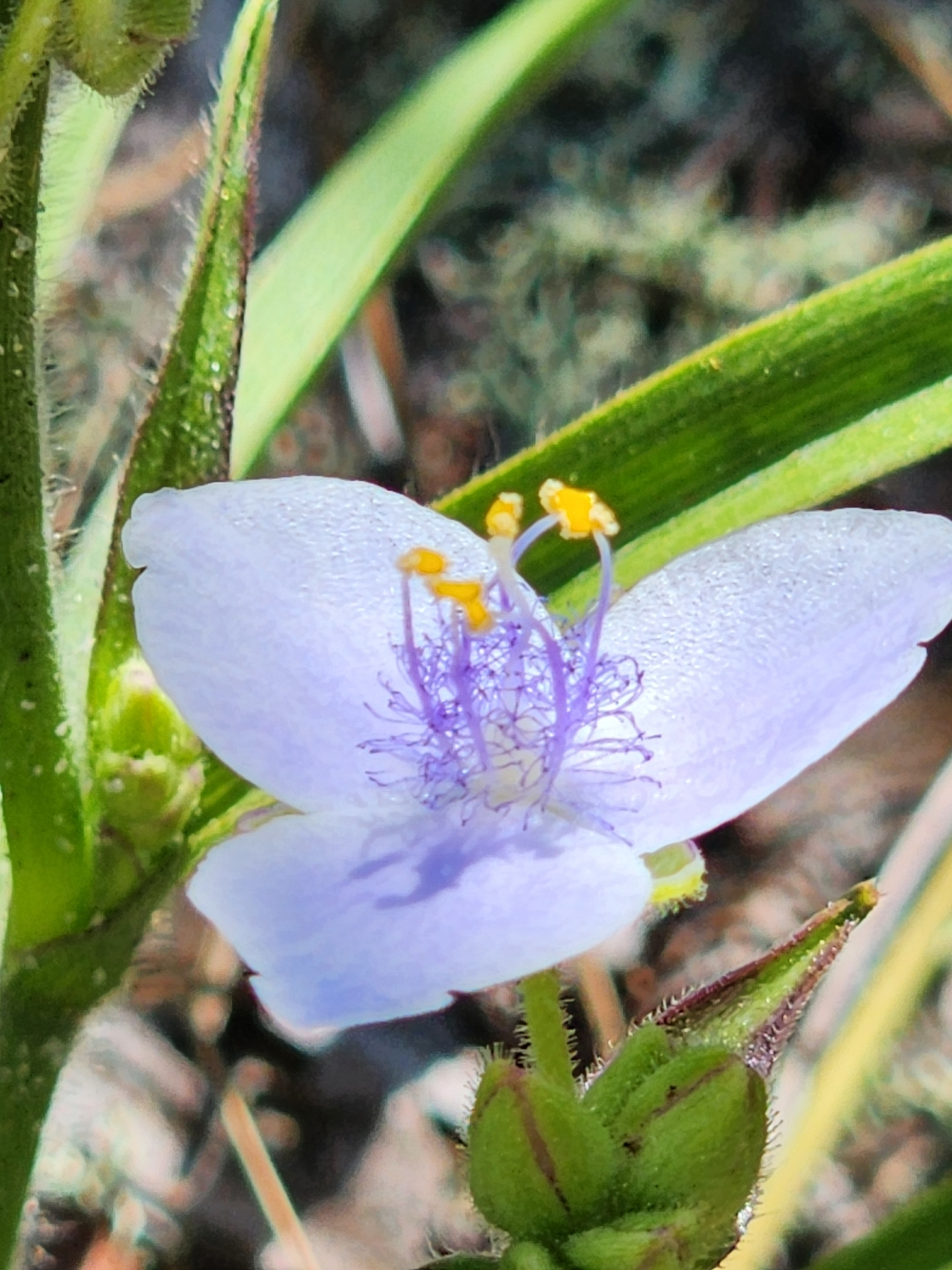

== Conservation ==
It is known from about 64 sites and is threatened by habitat loss and fragmentation due to development for real estate and agriculture. Other threats may include invasive species and wildfire suppression. As such, it is presently listed as vulnerable (S3) in Florida, imperiled (S2) in Georgia, and critically imperiled (S1) in South Carolina.

Populations of this species are known to exist on several protected lands including Alabama's Talladega National Forest, Georgia's Fort Stewart, and Florida's Ocala National Forest, Lake Wales Ridge National Wildlife Refuge, Archbold Biological Station, Allen David Broussard Catfish Creek Preserve State Park, Highlands Hammock State Park, and Lake June in Winter Scrub State Park.
