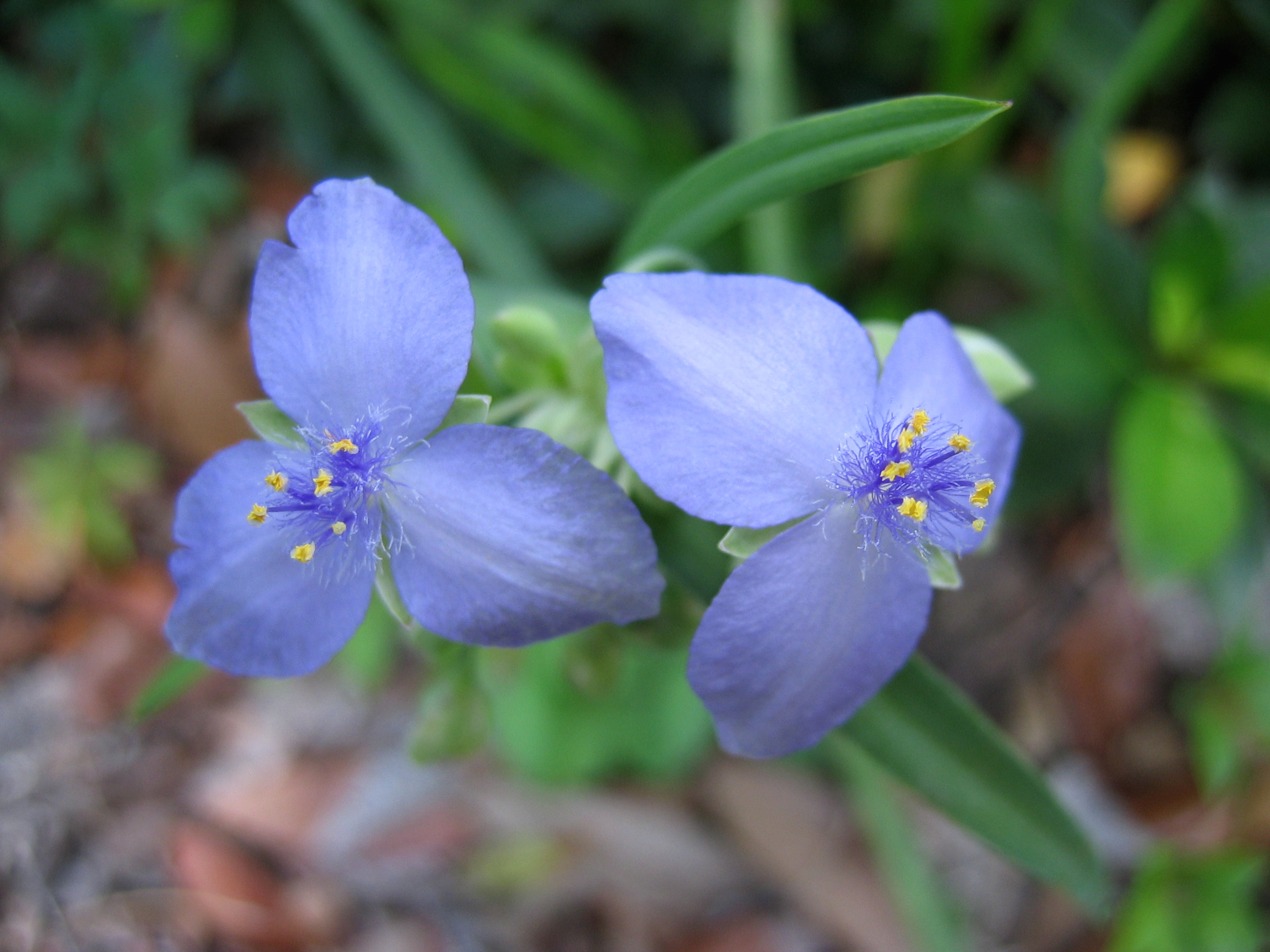
- Tradescantia ohiensis

Scientific classification
- Kingdom: Plantae
- Clade: Tracheophytes
- Clade: Angiosperms
- Clade: Monocots
- Clade: Commelinids
- Order: Commelinales
- Family: Commelinaceae
- Subfamily: Commelinoideae
- Tribe: Tradescantieae
- Subtribe: Tradescantiinae
- Genus: Tradescantia; Ruppius ex L.

Type species
- Tradescantia virginiana L.

Sections
- Sections: * Austrotradescantia; Campelia; Coholomia; Corinna; Cymbispatha; Mandonia; Parasetcreasea; Rhoeo; Separotheca; Setcreasea; Tradescantia; Zebrina

Synonyms
- Synonyms: Campelia Rich.; Cymbispatha Pichon; Mandonia Hassk. 1871 not Wedd. 1864 nor Sch. Bip. 1865; Neomandonia Hutch.; Neotreleasea Rose; Rhoeo Hance; Separotheca Waterf.; Setcreasea K.Schum. & Syd.; Treleasea Rose illegitimate name; Zebrina Schnizl.; Ephemerum Mill.; Zanonia Plum. ex Cramer 1803 not L. 1753; Etheosanthes Raf.; Heminema Raf.; Sarcoperis Raf.; Tropitria Raf.; Heterachthia Kunze; Gonatandra Schltdl.; Disgrega Hassk.; Knowlesia Hassk.; Skofitzia Hassk. & Kanitz

= Tradescantia =

Genus of plants

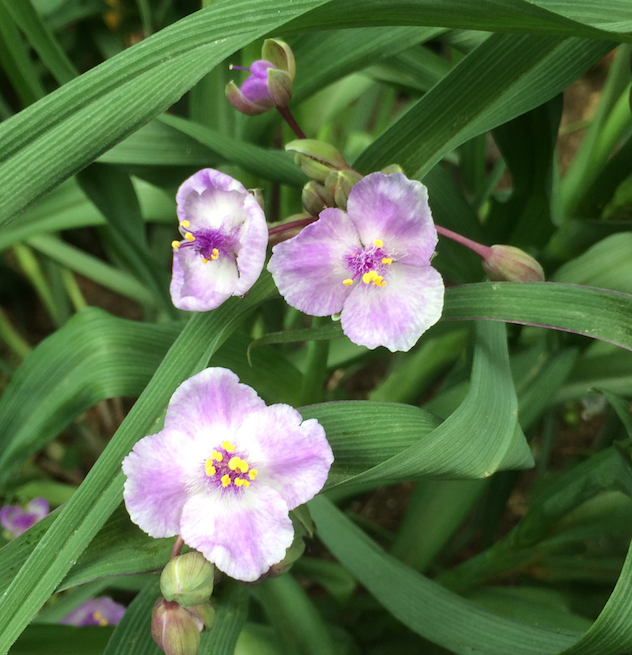
Unusual example with four petals and eight anthers

Tradescantia (/ˌtrædəˈskæntiə/) is a genus of 85 species of herbaceous perennial wildflowers in the family Commelinaceae, native to the Americas from southern Canada to northern Argentina, including the West Indies. Members of the genus are known by many common names, including inchplant, wandering jew, wandering dude, spiderwort, dayflower and trad.

Tradescantia grow 30–60 cm tall (1–2 ft), and are commonly found individually or in clumps in wooded areas and open fields. They were introduced into Europe as ornamental plants in the 17th century and are now grown in many parts of the world. Some species have become naturalized in regions of Europe, Asia, Africa, and Australia, and on some oceanic islands.

The genus's many species are of interest to cytogenetics because of evolutionary changes in the structure and number of their chromosomes. They have also been used as bioindicators for the detection of environmental mutagens. Some species have become pests to cultivated crops and considered invasive.

== Description ==
Tradescantia are herbaceous perennials and include both climbing and trailing species, reaching 30–60 centimetres (0.98–1.97 ft) in height. The stems are usually succulent or semi-succulent, and the leaves are sometimes semi-succulent. The leaves are long, thin and blade-like to lanceolate, from 3–45 cm long (1.2–17.7 in). The flowers can be white, pink, purple or blue, with three petals and six yellow anthers (or rarely, four petals and eight anthers). The sap is mucilaginous and clear.

A number of species have flowers that last for only a day, opening in the morning and closing by the evening.

== Etymology ==
The scientific name of the genus chosen by Carl Linnaeus honours the English naturalists and explorers John Tradescant the Elder (c. 1570s – 1638) and John Tradescant the Younger (1608–1662), who introduced many new plants to English gardens. Tradescant the Younger visited the new colony of Virginia in 1637 (and possibly twice more in later years). From there, the type species, Tradescantia virginiana, was brought to England in 1629.

Plants of the genus are called by many common names, varying by region and country. The name "inchplant" is thought to describe the plant's fast growth, or the fact that leaves are an inch apart on the stem. "Spiderwort" refers to the sap which dries into web-like threads when a stem is cut. The name "dayflower", shared with other members of the Commelinaceae family, refers to the flowers which open and close within a single day.

The controversial name "wandering Jew" originates from the Christian myth of the Wandering Jew, condemned to wander the earth for taunting Jesus on the way to his crucifixion. Since at least 2019 there have been efforts to stop using this and other potentially offensive common names, in favour of alternatives such as "wandering dude" or "wandering willie".

In Spanish, Tradescantia plants are sometimes referred to as flor de Santa Lucía (Saint Lucy's flower), in reference to the Saint's reputation as the patron saint of sight, and the use of the juice of the plant as eye drops to relieve congestion.

== Taxonomy ==
=== Subdivisions and species ===
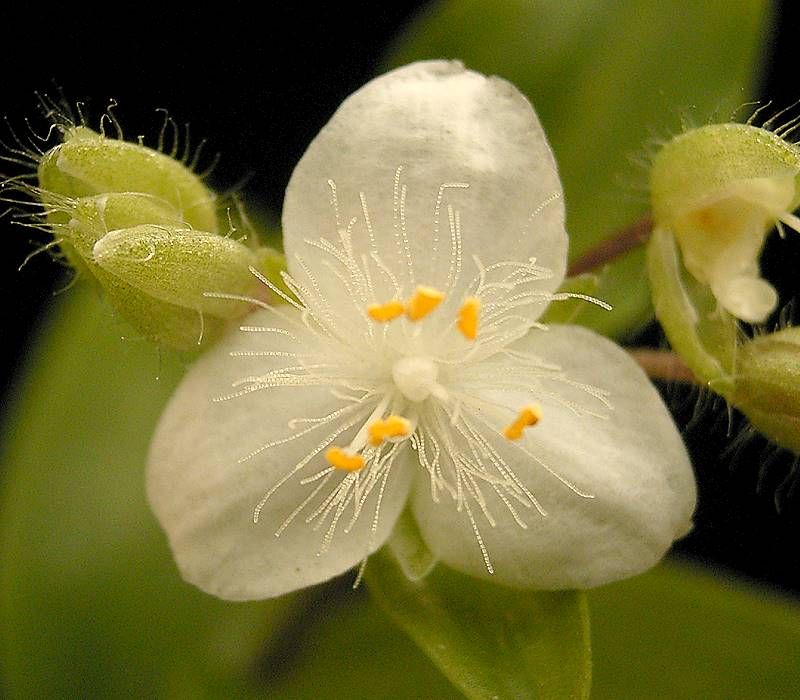
Tradescantia fluminensis (subg. Austrotradescantia)

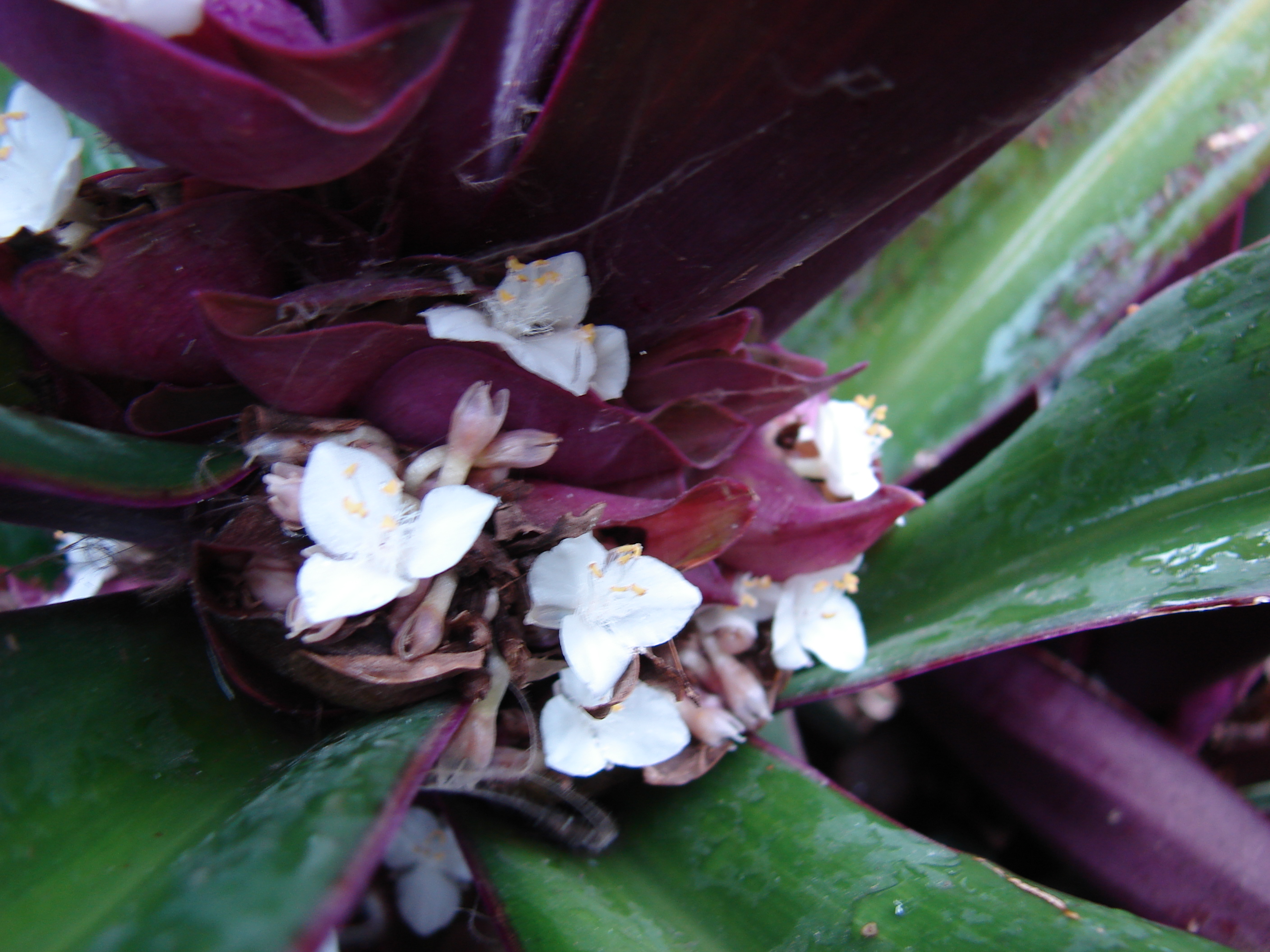
Tradescantia spathacea (subg. Campelia)

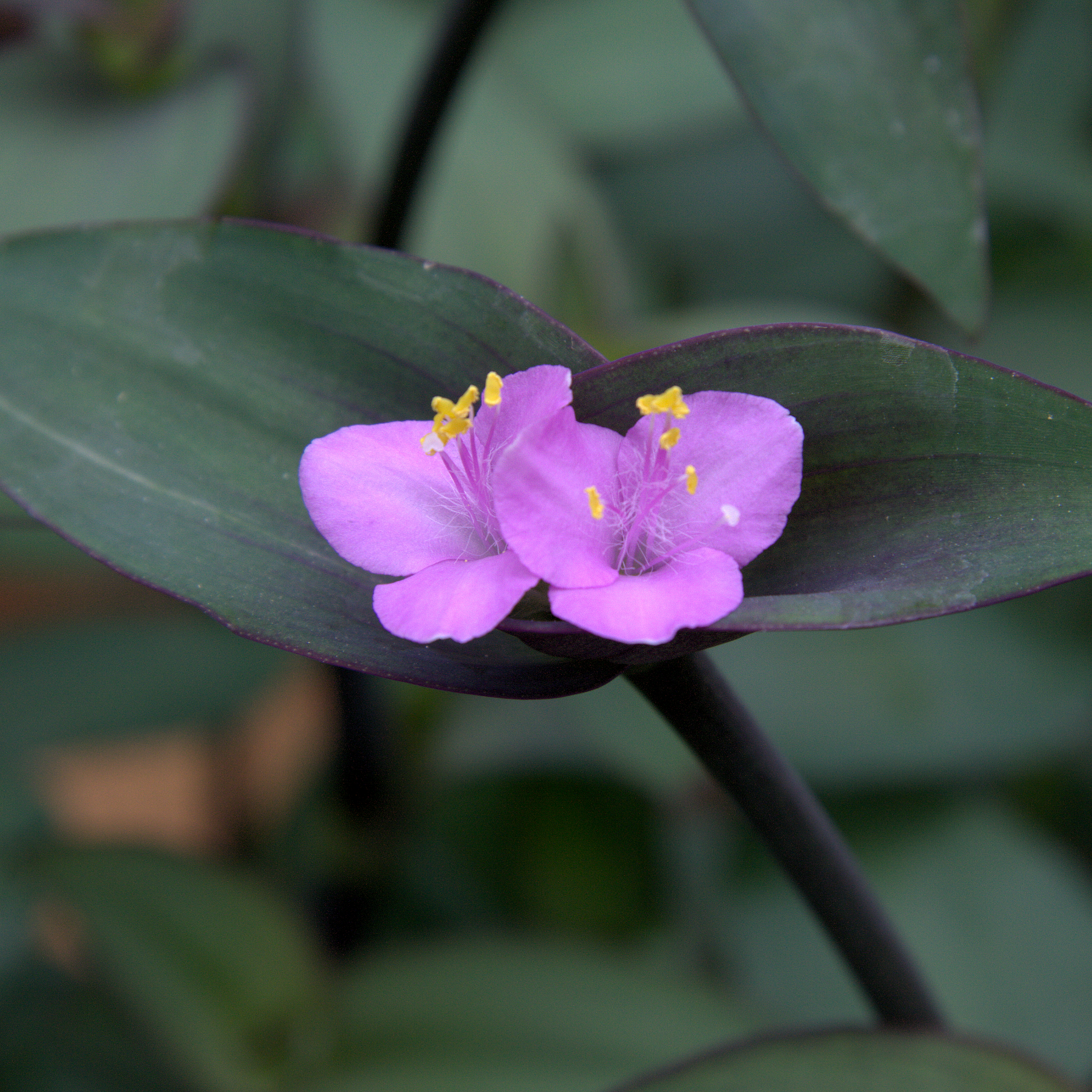
Tradescantia brevifolia (subg. Setcreasea)

The number of species and infrageneric taxa has changed throughout history. The first major classification proposed by Hunt (1980) included 60 species divided into eight sections, with one section divided into a further four series. Hunt's 1986 revision united several small genera with Tradescantia as sections, resulting in a total of twelve sections comprising 68 species, and this infrageneric classification was accepted for several decades.

A recent study by Pellegrini (2017) proposed a new classification based on recent morphological research, dividing the genus into five subgenera. As of December 2023, The Royal Botanic Gardens, Kew recognises 86 species.

Subgenus Austrotradescantia (D.R.Hunt) M.Pell

- Tradescantia atlantica M.Pell.
- Tradescantia catharinensis Hassemer & Funez syn. T. crassula var. gaudichaudii
- Tradescantia cerinthoides Kunth syn. T. blossfeldiana
- Tradescantia chrysophylla M.Pell. syn. T. serrana
- Tradescantia crassula Link & Otto syn. T. schwirkowskiana
- Tradescantia cymbispatha C.B.Clarke
- Tradescantia decora W.Bull syn. T. multibracteata, T. valida
- Tradescantia fluminensis Vell.
- Tradescantia hertweckii M.Pell.
- Tradescantia mundula Kunth syn. T. insularis
- Tradescantia seubertiana M.Pell.
- Tradescantia tenella Kunth
- Tradescantia tucumanensis M.Pell.
- Tradescantia umbraculifera Hand.-Mazz.

Subgenus Campelia (Rich.) M.Pell.

Sect. Campelia

- Tradescantia zanonia (L.) Sw.

Sect. Corinna D.R.Hunt

- Tradescantia soconuscana Matuda

Sect. Cymbispatha (Pichon) D.R.Hunt

- Tradescantia commelinoides Schult. & Schult.f
- Tradescantia deficiens Brandegee
- Tradescantia gracillima Stand.
- Tradescantia grantii Faden
- Tradescantia plusiantha Stand.
- Tradescantia poelliae D.R.Hunt
- Tradescantia praetermissa M.Pell.
- Tradescantia standleyi Steyerm.

Sect. Rhoeo (Hance) D.R.Hunt

- Tradescantia spathacea Sw.

Sect. Zebrina (Schnizl.) D.R.Hunt

- Tradescantia huehueteca (Standl. & Steyerm) D.R.Hunt
- Tradescantia schippii D.R.Hunt
- Tradescantia zebrina Heynh. ex Bosse

- var. flocculosa (G.Brückn.) D.R.Hunt
- var. mollipila D.R.Hunt
- var. zebrina
Subgenus Mandonia (D.R.Hunt) M.Pell.

- Tradescantia ambigua Mart. ex Schult. & Schult.f.
- Tradescantia andrieuxii C.B.Clarke
- Tradescantia boliviana (Hassk.( J.R.Grant
- Tradescantia burchii D.R.Hunt
- Tradescantia crassifolia Cav.

- var. acaulis (M.Martens & Galeotti) C.B.Clarke
- var. crassifolia

- Tradescantia exaltata D.R.Hunt
- Tradescantia gentryi D.R.Hunt
- Tradescantia guiengolensis Matuda
- Tradescantia iridescens Lindl. syn. T. crassifolia var. acaulis
- Tradescantia llamasii Matuda
- Tradescantia masonii Matuda
- Tradescantia mcvaughii D.R.Hunt
- Tradescantia mixtecana Hern.-Cárdenas, López-Ferr. & Espejo
- Tradescantia murilloae Zamudio et al.
- Tradescantia nuevoleonensis Matuda
- Tradescantia peninsularis Brandegee
- Tradescantia petricola J.R.Grant
- Tradescantia tepoxtlana Matuda
- Tradescantia velutina Kunth & C.D.Bouché

Subgenus Setcreasea (K.Schum. & Sydow) M.Pell

- Tradescantia brevifolia (Torr.) Rose
- Tradescantia buckleyi (I.M.Johnst.) D.R.Hunt
- Tradescantia hirta D.R.Hunt
- Tradescantia leiandra Torr.
- Tradescantia mirandae Matuda
- Tradescantia orchidophylla Rose & Hemsl.
- Tradescantia pallida (Rose) D.R.Hunt
- Tradescantia pygmaea D.R.Hunt
- Tradescantia rozynskii Matuda
- Tradescantia sillamontana Matuda

Subgenus Tradescantia

- Tradescantia bracteata Small ex Britton
- Tradescantia cirrifera Mart.
- Tradescantia edwardsiana Tharp
- Tradescantia ernestiana E.S.Anderson & Woodson
- Tradescantia gigantea Rose
- Tradescantia gypsophila B.L.Turner
- Tradescantia hirsuticaulis Small
- Tradescantia hirsutiflora Bush
- Tradescantia humilis Rose
- Tradescantia longipes E.S.Anderson & Woodson
- Tradescantia monosperma Brandegee
- Tradescantia occidentalis (Britton) Smyth

- var. melanthera MacRoberts
- var. scopulorum (Rose) E.S.Anderson & Woodson
- var. occidentalis

- Tradescantia ohiensis Raf.
- Tradescantia ozarkana E.S.Anderson & Woodson
- Tradescantia pedicellata Celarier
- Tradescantia pinetorum Greene
- Tradescantia reverchonii Bush
- Tradescantia roseolens Small
- Tradescantia stenophylla Brandegee
- Tradescantia subacaulis Bush
- Tradescantia subaspera Ker Gawl.

- var. montana (Shuttlew. ex Small & Vail) E.S.Anderson & Woodson
- var. subaspera

- Tradescantia subtilis Matuda syn. T. maysillesii
- Tradescantia tharpii E.S.Anderson & Woodson
- Tradescantia virginiana L.
- Tradescantia wrightii Rose & Bush

=== Unclassified ===
- Tradescantia petiolaris M.E.Jones

=== Formerly placed here ===
- Tradescantia × andersoniana W.Ludw. & Rohweder The name was published with no description, so is not a valid botanical name; the taxon is now treated as a cultivar group.
- Callisia navicularis (Ortgies) D.R.Hunt (as T. navicularis Ortgies)
- Callisia warszewicziana (Kunth & C.D.Bouché) D.R.Hunt (as T. warszewicziana Kunth & C.D.Bouché)
- Gibasis geniculata (Jacq.) Rohweder (as T. geniculata Jacq.)
- Gibasis karwinskyana (Schult. & Schult.f.) Rohweder (as T. karwinskyana Schult. & Schult.f.)
- Gibasis pellucida (M.Martens & Galeotti) D.R.Hunt (as T. pellucida M.Martens & Galeotti)
- Siderasis fuscata (Lodd. et al.) H.E.Moore (as T. fuscata Lodd. et al.)
- Tinantia anomala (Torr.) C.B.Clarke (as T. anomala Torr.)
- Tripogandra diuretica (Mart.) Handlos (as T. diuretica Mart.)
- Elasis hirsuta (Kunth) D.R.Hunt (as T. hirsuta)

== Distribution and habitat ==
The first species described, the Virginia spiderwort, T. virginiana, is native to the eastern United States from Maine to Alabama, and Canada in southern Ontario. Virginia spiderwort was introduced to Europe in 1629, where it is cultivated as a garden flower.

The natural range of the genus as a whole spans nearly the entire length and width of mainland North America, from Canada through Mexico and Central America, and thrives in a great diversity of temperate and tropical habitats. It is frequently found in thinly wooded deciduous forests, plains, prairies, and healthy fields, often alongside other native wildflowers.

== Conservation ==
The western spiderwort T. occidentalis is listed as an endangered species in Canada, where the northernmost populations of the species are found at a few sites in southern Saskatchewan, Manitoba and Alberta; it is more common further south in the United States to Texas and Arizona.

== Cultivation ==
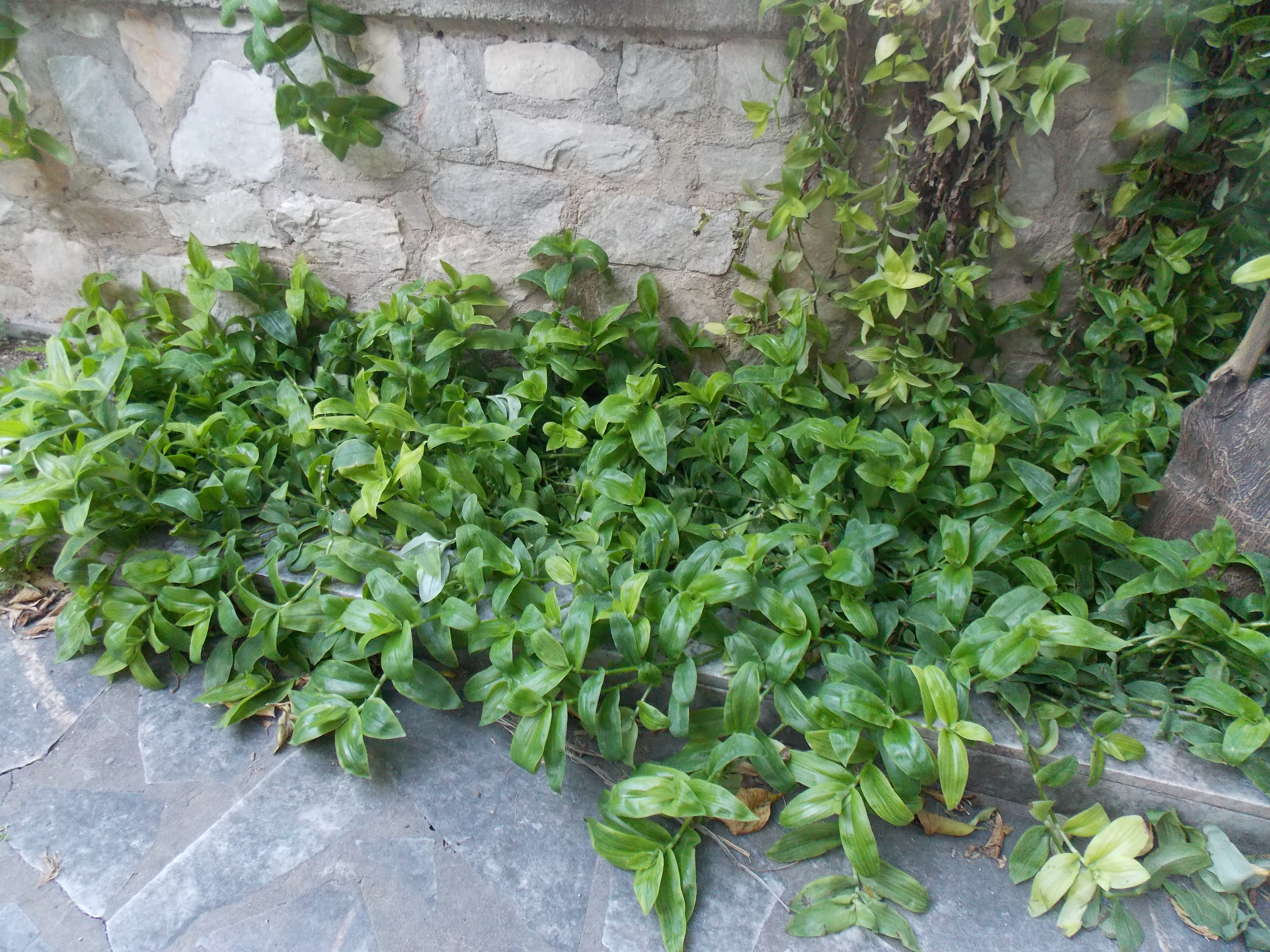
Tradescantia plants are widely used for ground cover in gardens

Spiderworts are popular in Europe and North America as ornamental plants. Temperate species are grown as hardy garden perennials, while tropical species such as T. zebrina and T. spathacea are used as house plants. Their popularity and easy spreading nature has led to some species being considered serious weeds in certain places (see below).

Most cold-hardy garden plants belong to the Andersoniana Group (often referred to with the invalid name Tradescantia × andersoniana). This is a group of interspecific hybrids developed from Tradescantia virginiana, T. ohiensis, and T. subaspera, which have overlapping ranges within continental North America. These plants are clump-forming herbaceous perennials, with individual cultivars mainly differing in flower colour.

A wide range of tender tropical species are cultivated as houseplants or outdoor annuals in temperate locations, including Tradescantia zebrina, T. fluminensis, T. spathacea, T. sillamontana, and T. pallida. They are typically grown for their foliage, and many have colourful variegated patterns of silver, purple, green, pink, and gold.

=== Cultivars ===
The following cultivars have gained the Royal Horticultural Society's Award of Garden Merit:

- T. (Andersoniana Group) 'Concord Grape'
- T. cerinthoides 'Nanouk'
- T. cerinthoides 'Variegata'
- T. fluminensis 'Aurea'
- T. fluminensis 'Quicksilver'
- T. pallida 'Purpurea'
- T. spathacea 'Rainbow'
- T. zebrina 'Purpusii'
- T. zebrina 'Quadricolor'

The International Society for Horticultural Science appointed Tradescantia Hub as an International Cultivar Registration Authority (ICRA) for Tradescantia in 2022. As an ICR authority, the Hub is responsible for recording and maintaining a checklist of the correct names for all cultivars in the genus.

== Weeds ==
Due to its ready propagation from stem fragments and its domination of the ground layer in many forest environments, T. fluminensis has become a major environmental weed in Australia, New Zealand and the southern United States. Other species considered invasive weeds in certain places include T. pallida, T. spathacea, and T. zebrina.

== Toxicity ==
Some members of the genus Tradescantia may cause allergic reactions in pets (especially cats and dogs) characterised by red, itchy skin. Notable culprits include T. albiflora (scurvy weed), T. spathacea (Moses in the cradle), and T. pallida (purple heart).

== Uses ==
Native Americans used T. virginiana to treat a number of conditions, including stomachache. It was also used as a food source. The cells of the stamen hairs of some Tradescantia are colored blue, but when exposed to sources of ionizing radiation such as gamma rays or pollutants like sulphur dioxide from industries, the cells mutate and change color to pink; they are one of the few tissues known to serve as an effective bioassay for ambient radiation levels.

== Gallery ==
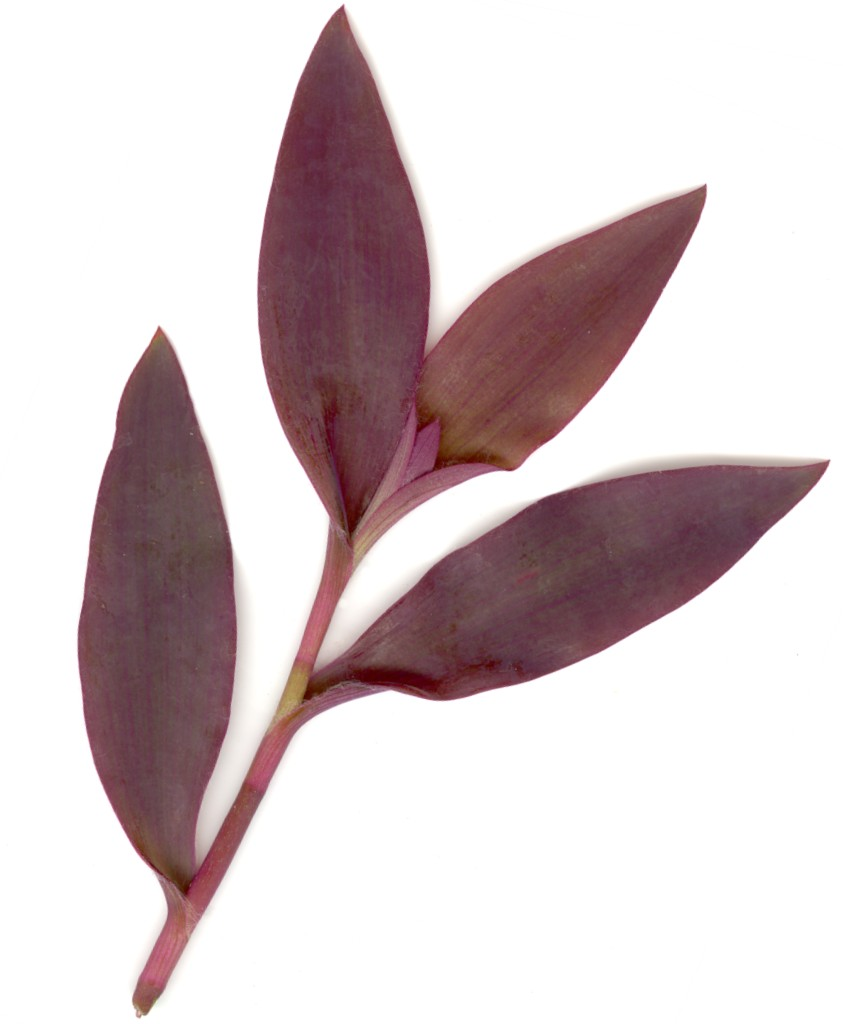
Front view of leaves of Tradescantia pallida 'Purpurea'

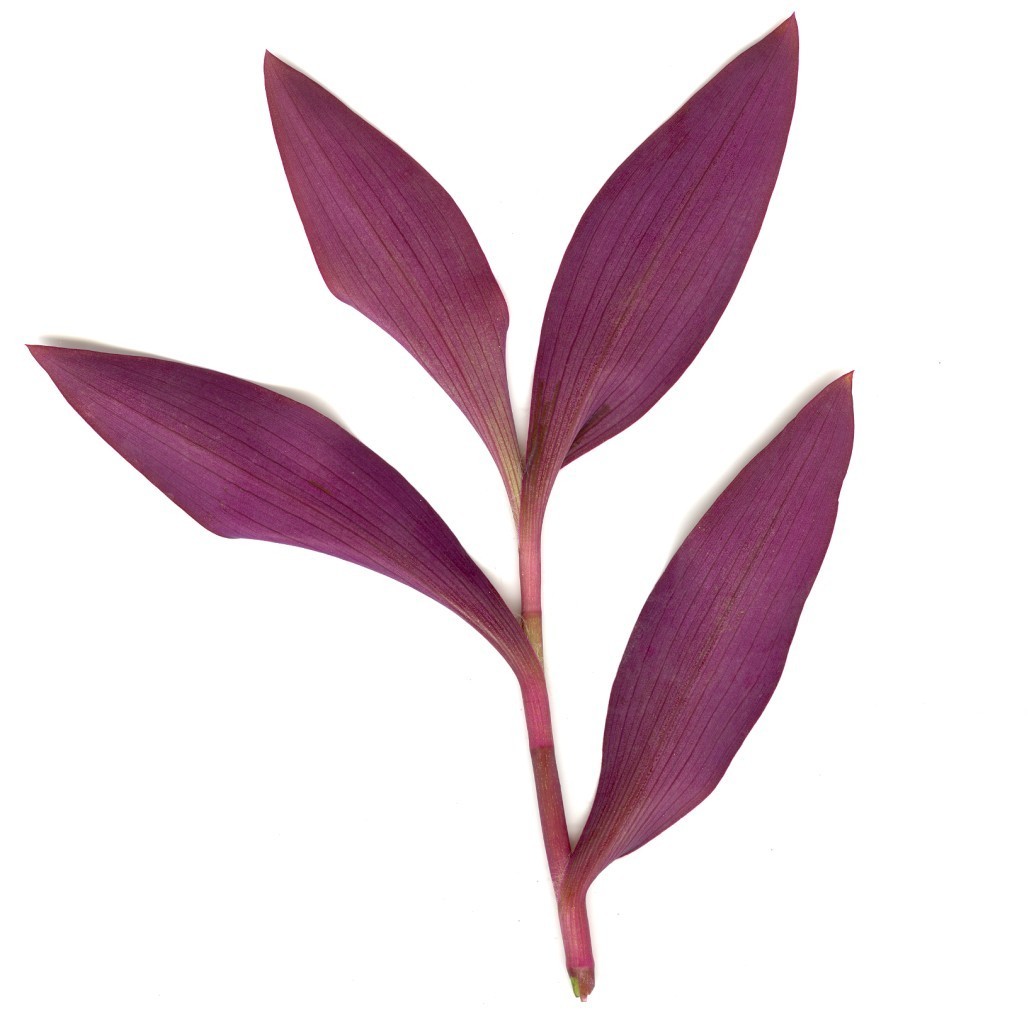
Back view of leaves of Tradescantia pallida 'Purpurea'

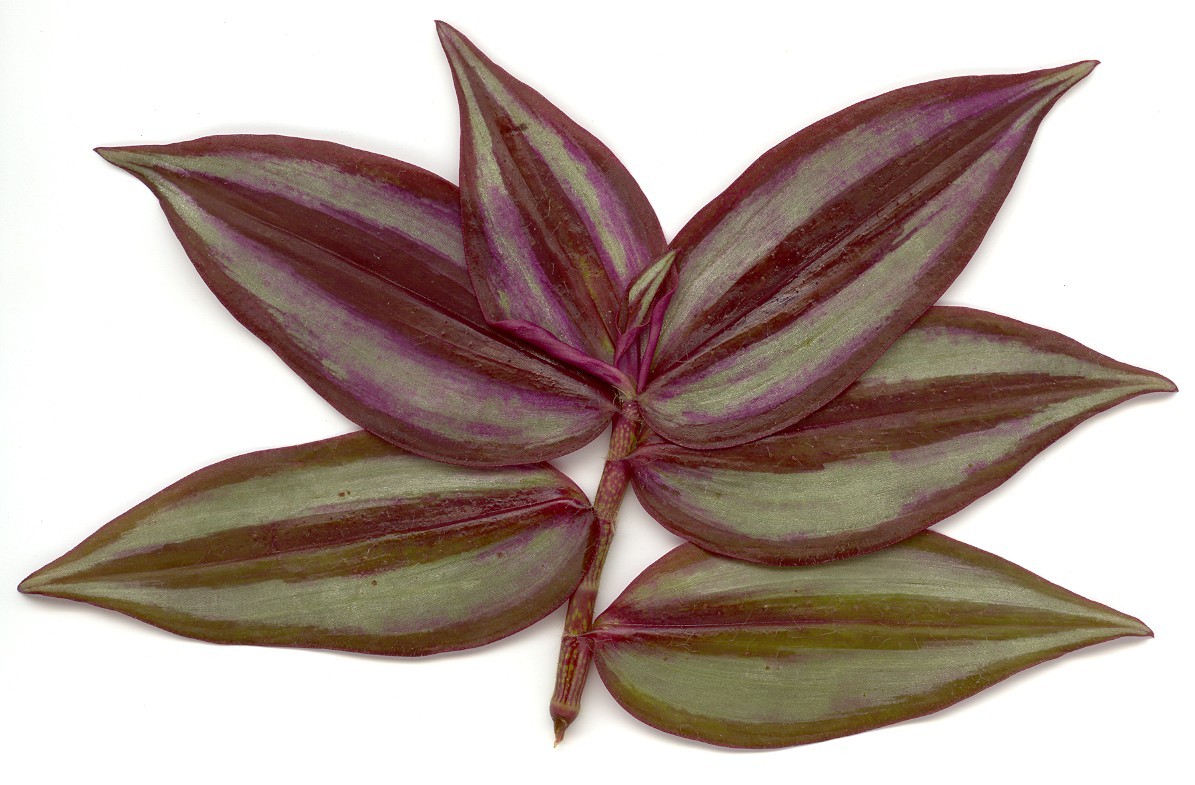
Front view of leaves of Tradescantia zebrina 'Violet Hill'

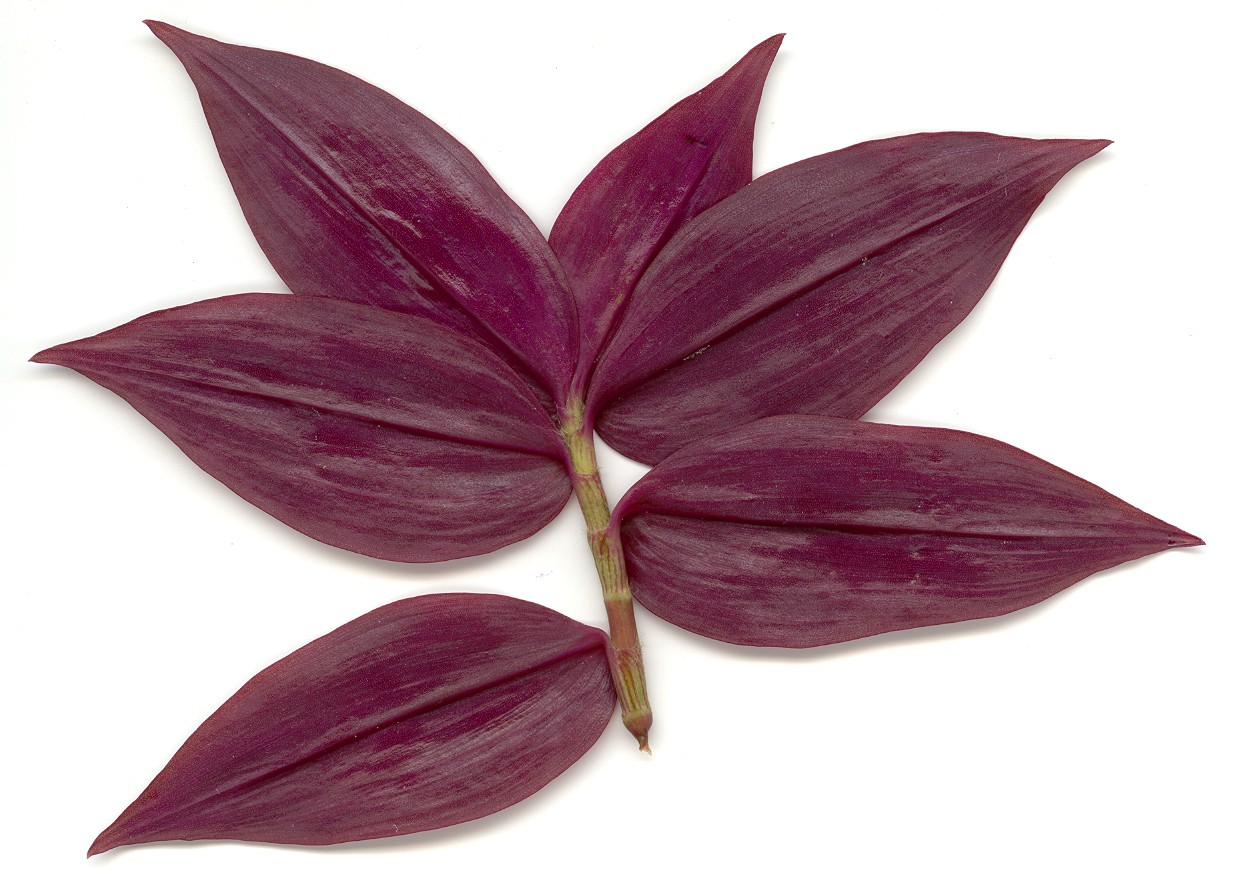
Back view of leaves of Tradescantia zebrina 'Violet Hill'

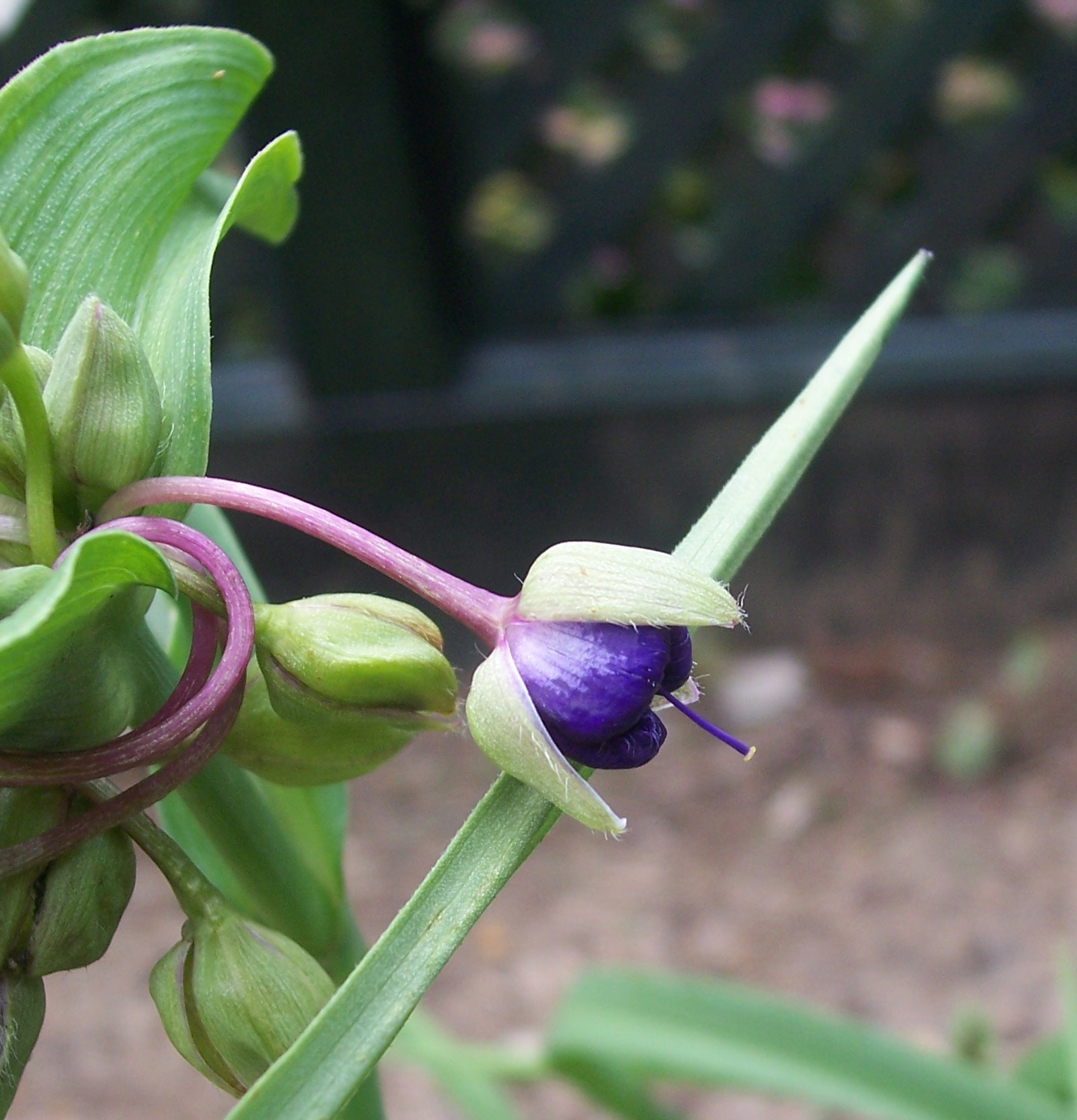
A budding Tradescantia flower

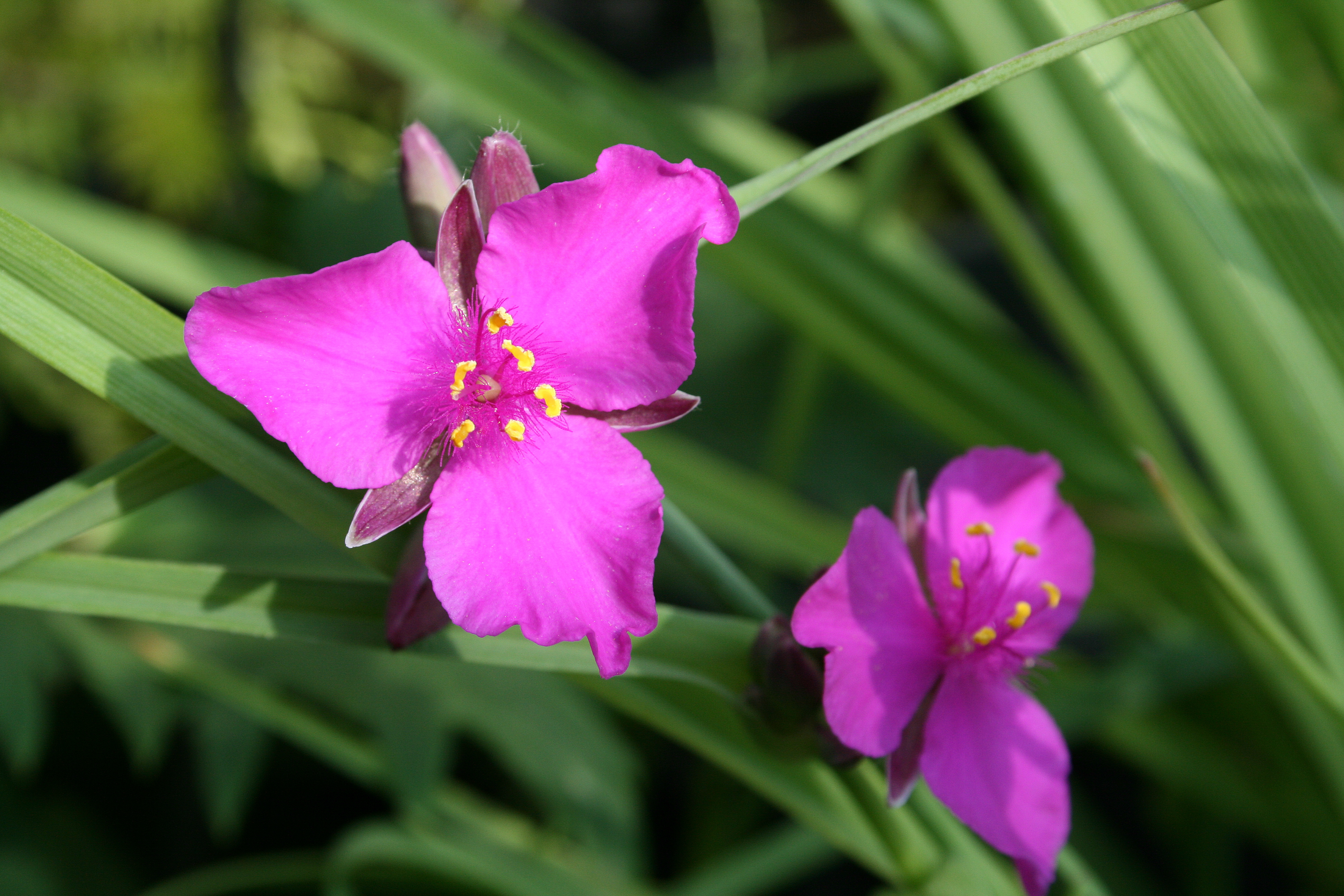
Tradescantia (Andersoniana Group) 'Red Grape'

== Bibliography ==
- Christman, Steve (10 March 2005). "Tradescantia Andersoniana Group". Floridata Plant Encyclopedia. Archived from the original on 2015-06-14.
- Dave's Garden (2015). "Welcome to Dave's Garden!". Internet Brands.
- Hawke, Richard G. (2010). "A Comparative Study of Tradescantia Cultivars" (PDF). Plant Evaluation Notes (34): 1–9.
- Beal, Janet. "Common Names for Tradescantia Flowers". SFGate.
- Edgar, Anderson; Karl, Sax (March 1936). "A Cytological Monograph of the American Species of Tradescantia". Botanical Gazette. 97 (3): 433–476. doi:10.1086/334582. JSTOR 2471708. S2CID 84332339.
