= Tradescantia pinetorum =

Scientific classification
- Kingdom: Plantae
- Clade: Tracheophytes
- Clade: Angiosperms
- Clade: Monocots
- Clade: Commelinids
- Order: Commelinales
- Family: Commelinaceae
- Subfamily: Commelinoideae
- Tribe: Tradescantieae
- Subtribe: Tradescantiinae
- Genus: Tradescantia
- Species: T. pinetorum

Binomial name
- Tradescantia pinetorum Greene

Species of flowering plant

Tradescantia pinetorum, the pinewoods spiderwort, is a species of Tradescantia and part of the family Commelinaceae.

Tradescantia pinetorum is found in open woods in the southwestern United States (Arizona + New Mexico) and northwestern Mexico (Chihuahua y Sonora).

== Growth ==
Tradescantia pinetorum has strongly pubescent sheaths and purple petals that are 8–10 millimetres (0.31–0.39 in) long. The genus Commelina has flower buds enclosed in a sheath called a spathe, while Tradescantia does not have a spathe. Tradescantia pinetorum has glandular pubescent sepals, while Tradescantia occidentalis has glabrous sepals.

== Scientifically related plants ==
Scientifically related plants include Tradescantia pedicellata and Aneilema pinetorum.
