= Tradescantia gigantea =

Conservation status
- Apparently Secure (NatureServe)

Scientific classification
- Kingdom: Plantae
- Clade: Tracheophytes
- Clade: Angiosperms
- Clade: Monocots
- Clade: Commelinids
- Order: Commelinales
- Family: Commelinaceae
- Genus: Tradescantia
- Species: T. gigantea

Binomial name
- Tradescantia gigantea Rose

Species of flowering plant

Tradescantia gigantea, called giant spiderwort or gigantic spiderwort is a perennial herb in the spiderwort family found in prairies in Texas and Louisiana.

== Description ==
Tradescantia gigantea is a perennial herb that can grow up to 3 ft tall. It has simple, alternate, parallel-veined leaves with a long blade-like shape. Flowers appear in March and April. The flower is three-petaled with blooms that range from blue to purple to pink. The pH of the soil can determine flower color, with more acidic soils producing bluer flowers, and more alkaline soils producing pinker flowers.

== Range ==
Tradescantia gigantica is found in east and central Texas and some parts of Louisiana.

== Habitat ==
Tradescantia gigantica occurs in prairies and on the edges of woodland. It is tolerant of sun and partial shade and can grow in a wide range of soil types.

== Ecology ==
Tradescantia gigantica is a good source of nectar for native bees.
