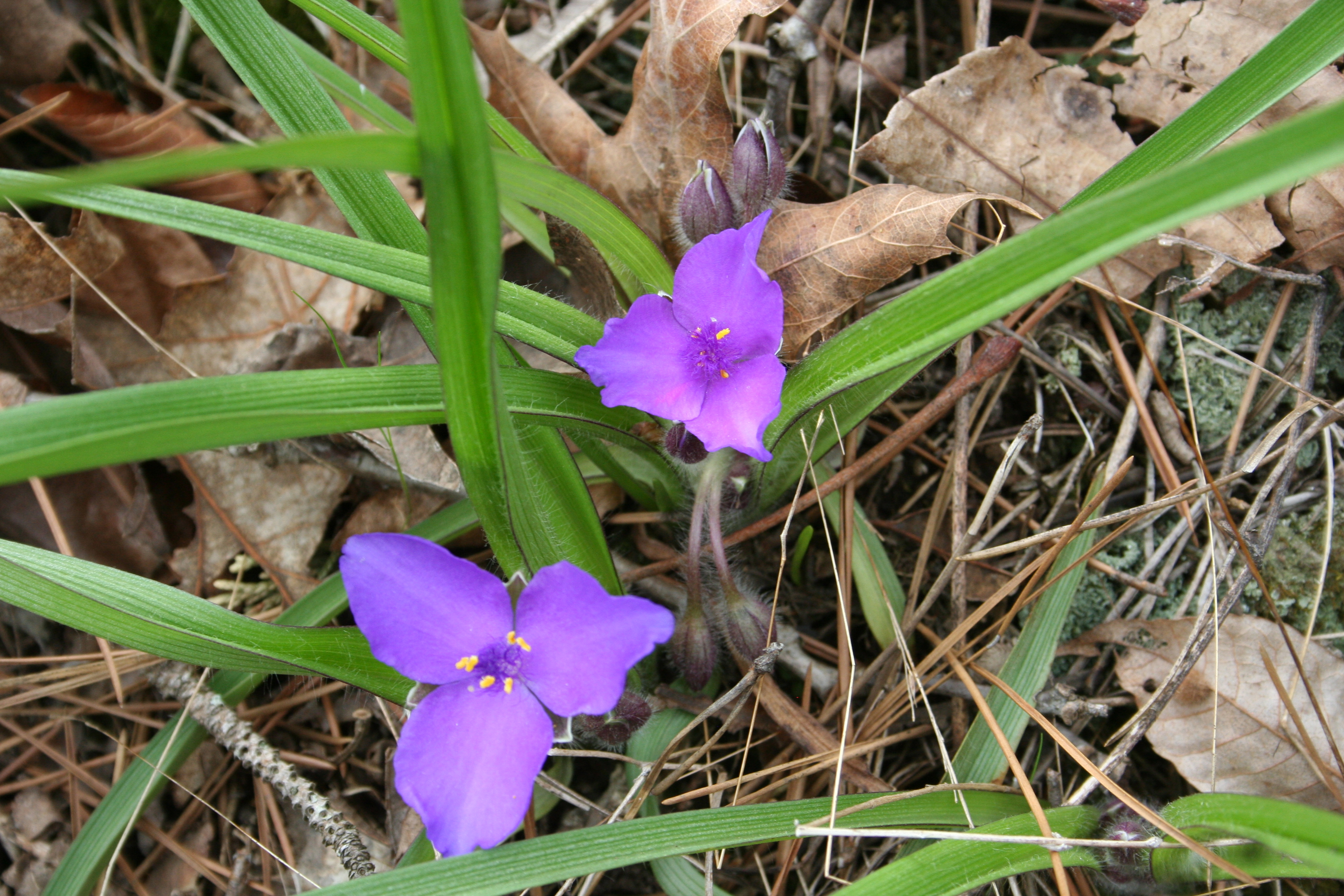
- Specimen in rocky soil on a sunny bluff in Johnson's Shut-Ins State Park, Reynolds County, Missouri, USA

Conservation status
- Apparently Secure (NatureServe)

Scientific classification
- Kingdom: Plantae
- Clade: Tracheophytes
- Clade: Angiosperms
- Clade: Monocots
- Clade: Commelinids
- Order: Commelinales
- Family: Commelinaceae
- Subfamily: Commelinoideae
- Tribe: Tradescantieae
- Subtribe: Tradescantiinae
- Genus: Tradescantia
- Species: T. longipes

Binomial name
- Tradescantia longipes E.S.Anderson & Woodson

= Tradescantia longipes =

Species of herb

Tradescantia longipes, commonly known as the wild crocus (although it is not closely related to plants in the genus Crocus), is a perennial herbaceous plant in the dayflower family. It is found only in the Ozark Mountains of southern Missouri and northern Arkansas in the Midwest United States. A spring blooming species, its flowers can be observed from April to May, typically in its preferred habitat of wooded slopes on rocky hillsides. While most other members of the genus in North America have stems reaching at least a few inches above the soil, the flowering shoots of Tradescantia longipes are borne essentially at ground level. This character is shared with some individuals of Tradescantia hirsuticaulis and Tradescantia virginiana, two closely related species, although both typically have obvious stems. Regardless, Tradescantia longipes can be distinguished from the former with its longer pedicels and bracts without fine hairs, and from the latter by the presence of at least some glandular hairs on the sepals. Furthermore, Tradescantia longipes is a tetraploid, meaning it has four sets of chromosomes, while Tradescantia hirsuticaulis is diploid with only two sets. Tradescantia virginiana occurs in both diploid and tetraploid forms, although it is consistently tetraploid where its range overlaps with Trandescantia longipes.

A phylogenetic study based on the chloroplast DNA regions of trnL-trnF and rpL16, two commonly used gene regions for determining relationships, was unable to convincingly resolve the recent history of the evolution of Tradescantia longipes, but does suggest that it is closely related to the "erect Tradescantia" (series Virginianae), which includes most of the other North American species.

Tradescantia longipes can be grown as an ornamental plant for its showy flowers. It is considered especially suitable in rock gardens or native plant gardens, but may be grown in most situations so long as partial shade is provided. It is considered tolerant of nutrient poor soils, but prefers soils that are acidic, medium-moist, and well-drained. The plants grow in clumps that can be divided as desired. The leaves tend to die back after flowering ceases, and it is thus recommended that the plant be cut back to encourage new growth and potential re-flowering in the autumn.
