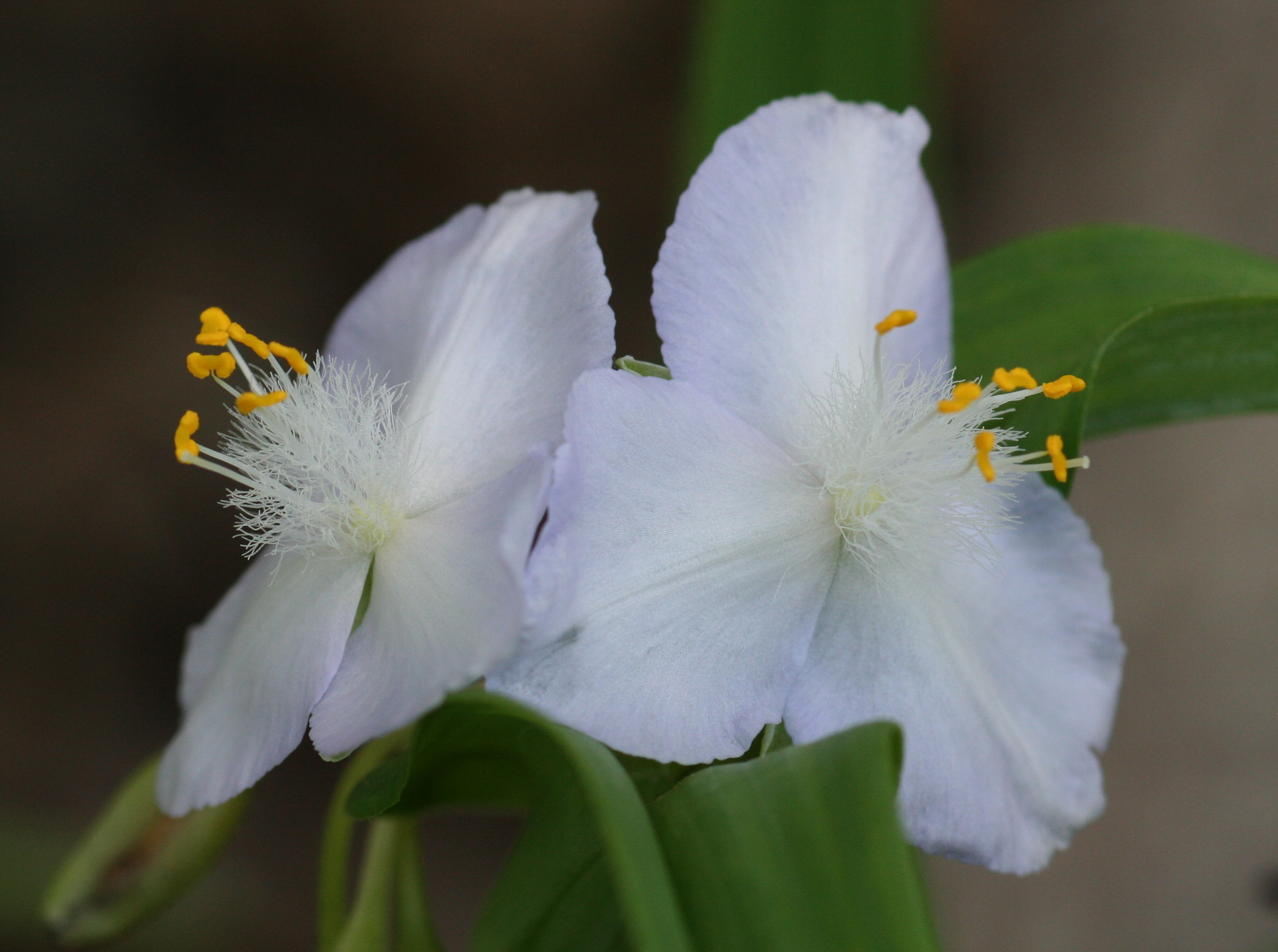
- Inflorescence of Tradescantia ozarkana in Osage, Caroll County, Arkansas

Conservation status
- Vulnerable (NatureServe)

Scientific classification
- Kingdom: Plantae
- Clade: Tracheophytes
- Clade: Angiosperms
- Clade: Monocots
- Clade: Commelinids
- Order: Commelinales
- Family: Commelinaceae
- Subfamily: Commelinoideae
- Tribe: Tradescantieae
- Subtribe: Tradescantiinae
- Genus: Tradescantia
- Species: T. ozarkana

Binomial name
- Tradescantia ozarkana E. S. Anderson & Woodson

= Tradescantia ozarkana =

Species of flowering plant

Tradescantia ozarkana, the Ozark spiderwort, is a species of Tradescantia. It is part of the Commelinaceae family, native to the States of Missouri, Arkansas, and Oklahoma in the south-central United States. It flowers from April to May and can be found in rich, rocky areas, including woods and bluff ledges.

== Description ==
The stems can grow to over 50 cm tall. They grow from thickened roots and are characterized as herbaceous, typically glabrous but occasionally hirsute. The stems are glaucous and somewhat succulent. The leaves are alternate and sheathing at the base, growing up to 30 cm long. Each leaf is about 4 cm broad. The leaves are glaucous above and below (less so above), glabrous, ciliate margined, and narrowly lanceolate. The inflorescence is terminal, bracteate, umbellate cymes are found about the flowers. The pedicels are about 3 cm long, glandular pilose, and strongly recurving in fruit. The flowers have three petals which are white to pink or lilac. They are glabrous and broadly ovate, about 2 cm long and forming broad, distinct shapes. Each flower has six stamens. The filaments are 3 mm long and are white, with dense multicellular hairs longer than the filament attached mostly to the lower half. The anthers are yellow and are 2 mm broad and 1 mm long. There is one style which is glabrous and 2–3 mm long. The ovaries are 3-locular (one ovule per locule), with erect gland-tipped hairs on the summit. They have three sepals and are ovate, acute and glandular pilose externally, glabrous internally. The sepals are about 8 mm long and 4 mm broad with free accrescent.

== Evolutionary history ==
A phylogenetic study based on the chloroplast DNA regions of trnL-trnF and rpL16, two commonly used gene regions for determining relationships, was unable to convincingly resolve the recent history of the evolution of Tradescantia ozarkana, but does suggest that it is closely related to the "erect Tradescantia" (series Virginianae), which includes most of the other North American species.
