= Tradescantia mundula =

Scientific classification
- Kingdom: Plantae
- Clade: Tracheophytes
- Clade: Angiosperms
- Clade: Monocots
- Clade: Commelinids
- Order: Commelinales
- Family: Commelinaceae
- Genus: Tradescantia
- Species: T. mundula

Binomial name
- Tradescantia mundula Kunth

Synonyms
- Tradescantia fluminensis f. bicolor Voss

Species of plant

Tradescantia mundula is a flowering plant of the family Commelinaceae. It is closely related to and often confused with Tradescantia fluminensis. It can be differentiated from the latter by its strigose stem and leaves and flat petals.
