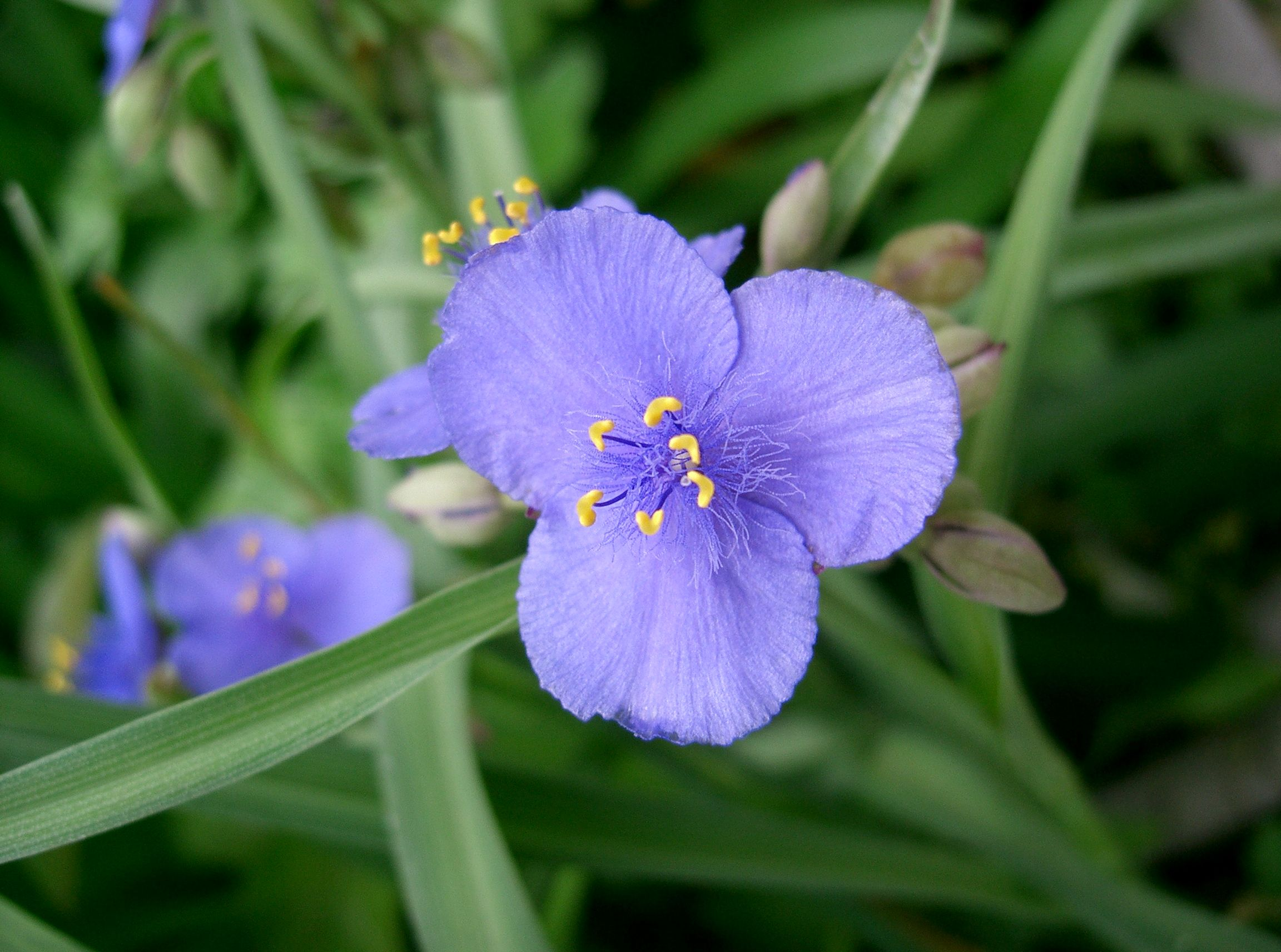
- Tradescantia ohiensis

Conservation status
- Secure (NatureServe)

Scientific classification
- Kingdom: Plantae
- Clade: Embryophytes
- Clade: Tracheophytes
- Clade: Spermatophytes
- Clade: Angiosperms
- Clade: Monocots
- Clade: Commelinids
- Order: Commelinales
- Family: Commelinaceae
- Subfamily: Commelinoideae
- Tribe: Tradescantieae
- Subtribe: Tradescantiinae
- Genus: Tradescantia
- Species: T. ohiensis

Binomial name
- Tradescantia ohiensis Raf.

Synonyms
- Tradescantella incarnata (Small) Small; Tradescantia canaliculata Raf.; Tradescantia canaliculata f. albiflora (Slavin & Nieuwl.) Deam; Tradescantia canaliculata f. lesteri (Standl.) Deam; Tradescantia canaliculata f. mariae (Standl.) Deam; Tradescantia foliosa Small; Tradescantia incarnata Small; Tradescantia ohiensis var. foliosa (Small) MacRoberts; Tradescantia ohiensis var. paludosa (E.S.Anderson & Woodson) MacRoberts; Tradescantia ohiensis f. pilosa Waterf.; Tradescantia paludosa E.S.Anderson & Woodson; Tradescantia reflexa Raf.; Tradescantia reflexa f. albiflora A.D.Slavin & Nieuwl.; Tradescantia reflexa var. eloiseana Farw.; Tradescantia reflexa f. lesteri Standl.; Tradescantia reflexa f. mariae Standl.; Tradescantia riparia Raf.

= Tradescantia ohiensis =

Ohio spiderwort

Species of flowering plant

Tradescantia ohiensis, commonly known as bluejacket or Ohio spiderwort, is an herbaceous plant species in the genus Tradescantia native to eastern and central North America. It is the most common and widely distributed species of Tradescantia in the United States, where it can be found from Maine in the northeast, west to Minnesota, and south to Texas and Florida. It also has a very small distribution in Canada in extreme southern Ontario near Windsor.

== Description ==
Distinguishing features of the species include glaucous leaves and stems, leaves forming an acute angle with the stems, sepals with hairs lacking glands which are confined to the apex if present at all, and a relatively tall habit (up to about 115 centimetres or 3 feet 9 inches). Typical habitats for the plant include roadsides, along railroads, and in fields and thickets. Less typically it can occur in woods, and sometimes along streams. As with many species in the genus, it often forms hybrids with related species where they co-occur. More specifically, at least nine different species are thought to be capable of forming hybrids with T. ohiensis.

== Uses ==
Ohio spiderwort has edible flowers and shoots. Flowers and stems can be eaten raw, while the leaves can be cooked. Leaves of the plant are mucilaginous and can be used to soothe insect bites in a similar way to aloe vera.
