= Tradescantia buckleyi =

Conservation status
- Vulnerable (NatureServe)

Scientific classification
- Kingdom: Plantae
- Clade: Tracheophytes
- Clade: Angiosperms
- Clade: Monocots
- Clade: Commelinids
- Order: Commelinales
- Family: Commelinaceae
- Genus: Tradescantia
- Species: T. buckleyi

Binomial name
- Tradescantia buckleyi (I.M.Johnst.) D.R.Hunt

Synonyms
- Setcreasea brevifolia var. buckleyi (I.M.Johnst.) Faruqi & K.L.Mehra; Setcreasea brevifolia var. nanella Faruqi & K.L.Mehra; Setcreasea brevifolia var. pulchella Faruqi & K.L.Mehra; Setcreasea buckleyi I.M.Johnst.; Tradescantia speciosa Buckley

Species of flowering plant

Tradescantia buckleyi, commonly known as Buckley's spiderwort, is a species of flowering plant in the dayflower family, Commelinaceae. It is native to southern Texas in the United States as well as northern Tamaulipas in Mexico. The specific name honours Samuel Botsford Buckley (1809-1884), who collected the type specimen near Corpus Christi, Texas.

== Description ==
T. buckleyi is a perennial with trailing, loosely branched stems up to 50 cm in length. The succulent, elliptic leaves are spirally arranged and may reach 12 × 3.5 cm. Their color ranges from dark green to purplish. Roots are tuberous, tufted, and can form at nodes. Inflorescences are terminal and pedunculate, with peduncles measuring 3–5.5 cm. The bracts resemble primary leaves but are smaller. Flowers are subsessile and have pedicels 0.7-0.8 cm in length. Petals are pale pink to white, measure 1 cm, and are clawed. The claws are basally connate and form a tube. The stamens are epipetalous and have bearded filaments and broad, orange connectives. The ovary is densely bearded. Capsules are subglobose, 3.5 mm in diameter, and contain seeds measuring 2–3 mm. The plant is glabrous aside from its pubescent capsules, sparsely pilose sepals, and slightly hairy pedicels. Blooming takes place from February to May.

== Synonyms ==
- Setcreasea brevifolia var. buckleyi (I.M.Johnst.) Faruqi & K.L.Mehra
- Setcreasea brevifolia var. nanella Faruqi & K.L.Mehra
- Setcreasea brevifolia var. pulchella Faruqi & K.L.Mehra
- Setcreasea buckleyi I.M.Johnst.
- Tradescantia speciosa Buckley
