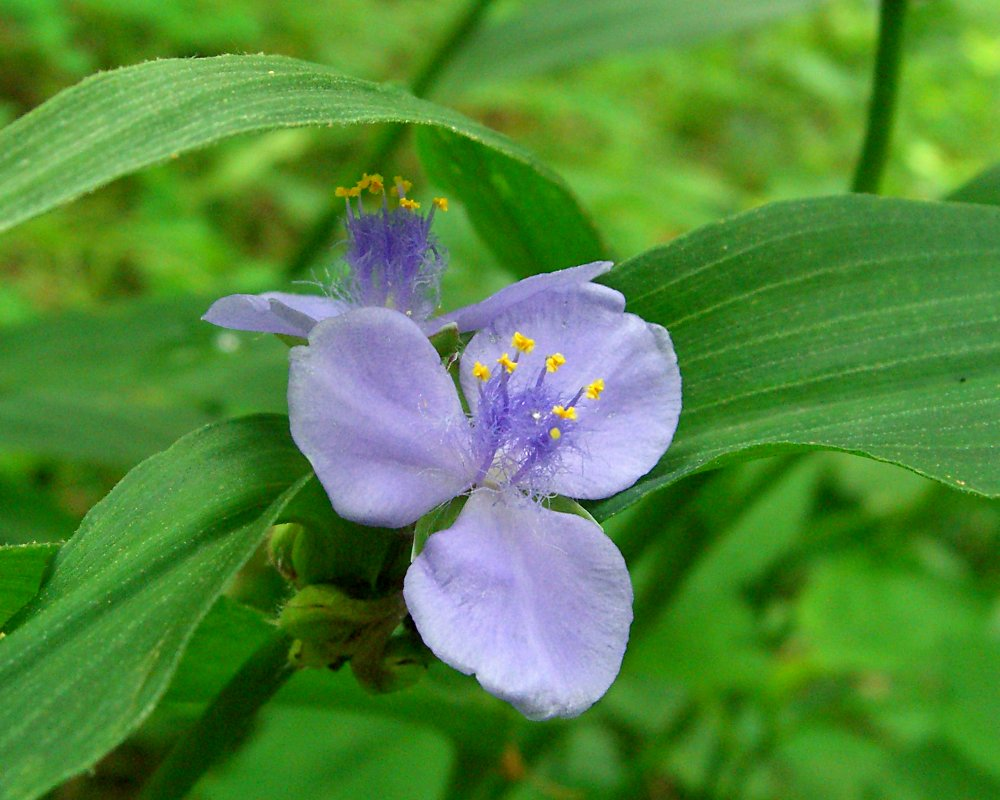
- Close-up of flowers
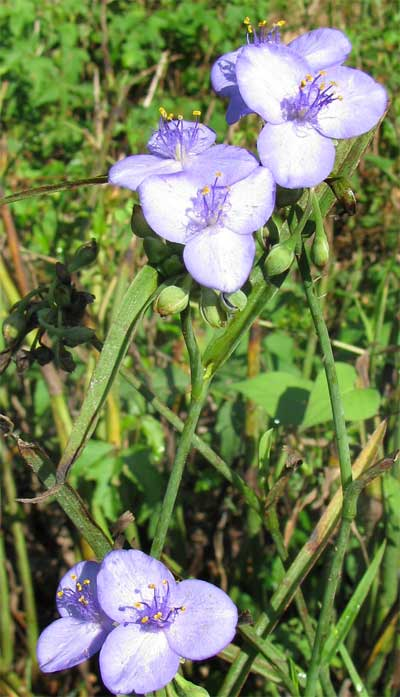
- Near Natchez, Mississippi

Conservation status
- Secure (NatureServe)

Scientific classification
- Kingdom: Plantae
- Clade: Embryophytes
- Clade: Tracheophytes
- Clade: Angiosperms
- Clade: Monocots
- Clade: Commelinids
- Order: Commelinales
- Family: Commelinaceae
- Genus: Tradescantia
- Species: T. subaspera

Binomial name
- Tradescantia subaspera Ker Gawl.

Synonyms
- Tradescantia axillaris f. subaspera (Ker Gawl.) Raf.; Tradescantia subaspera var. typica E.S.Anderson & Woodson

= Tradescantia subaspera =

Species of flowering plant

Tradescantia subaspera, the zigzag spiderwort, is a species of flowering plant in the family Commelinaceae, native to the eastern United States. Its zigzagging stems and wider leaves distinguish it from Tradescantia virginiana. It is recommended for shady naturalistic garden settings. It has three petals which are violet-blue to purple in color. Flowers bloom May to September.

== Subtaxa ==
The following varieties are accepted:

- Tradescantia subaspera var. montana (Shuttlew. ex Small & Vail) E.S.Anderson & Woodson
- Tradescantia subaspera var. subaspera
