= Tradescantia tharpii =

Scientific classification
- Kingdom: Plantae
- Clade: Tracheophytes
- Clade: Angiosperms
- Clade: Monocots
- Clade: Commelinids
- Order: Commelinales
- Family: Commelinaceae
- Genus: Tradescantia
- Species: T. tharpii

Binomial name
- Tradescantia tharpii E.S.Anderson & Woodson

Species of flowering plant

Tradescantia tharpii, the shortstem spiderwort or spider lily, is a species of flowering plant in the family Commelinaceae, native to the central United States. It is small for its genus, reaching only 8–12 in (20–30 cm). It is recommended for shady naturalistic settings.
