= Tradescantia umbraculifera =

Conservation status
- Least Concern (IUCN 3.1)

Scientific classification
- Kingdom: Plantae
- Clade: Tracheophytes
- Clade: Angiosperms
- Clade: Monocots
- Clade: Commelinids
- Order: Commelinales
- Family: Commelinaceae
- Genus: Tradescantia
- Species: T. umbraculifera

Binomial name
- Tradescantia umbraculifera Hand.-Mazz.

Species of perennial wildflower

Tradescantia umbraculifera is a species of perennial wildflower that is native to South Eastern South America, and naturalized in New Zealand. The scientific name umbraculifera means "carrying several umbrellas", which is a clear reference to its plentiful inflorescences per leaf axil that this species grows. It is native to Northeast Argentina, South Brazil, and Paraguay. The size of this plant species typically ranges between 30 and 80 centimeters with 1–4 double cincinni per leaf axis. Regarding their reproductive organs, the pistil of this species is longer than the stamens.

== Flowers ==
The flowers of T. umbraculifera are often a range of color between white and pink. Always with 3 sepals attached to three petals.

This species is dioecious with 1 pistil and 6 stamens. Each flower of this species has 1 ovary and 3 carpels.

== Cultivation ==
Many people living in areas where this species is not native keep T. umbraculifera in their homes as potted plants. Otherwise, this species can be found in the wild throughout South Eastern South America.
