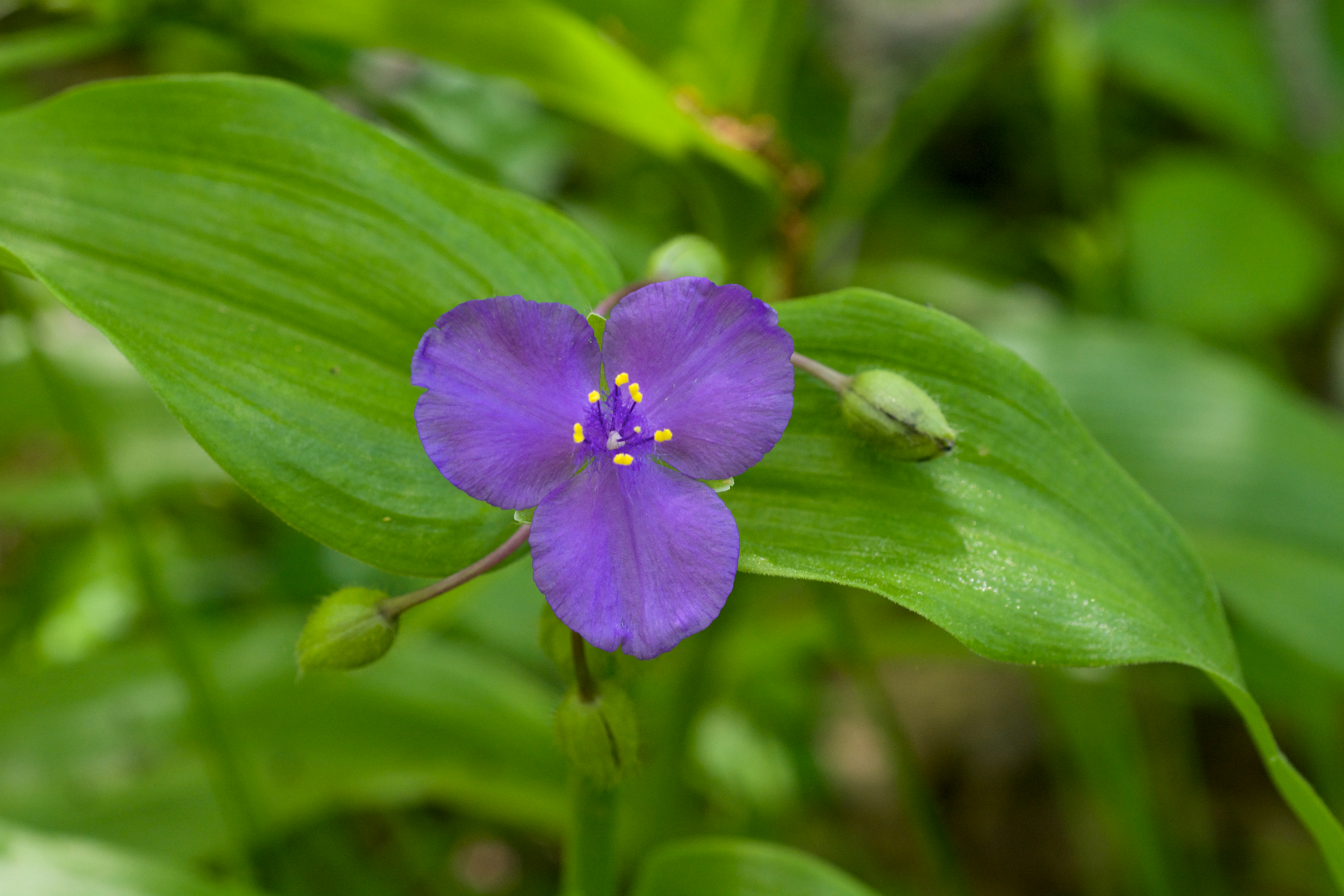

Scientific classification
- Kingdom: Plantae
- Clade: Tracheophytes
- Clade: Angiosperms
- Clade: Monocots
- Clade: Commelinids
- Order: Commelinales
- Family: Commelinaceae
- Genus: Tradescantia
- Species: T. ernestiana

Binomial name
- Tradescantia ernestiana (E.S. Anderson & Woodson)

= Tradescantia ernestiana =

Species of flowering plant

Tradescantia ernestiana, commonly called Ernest's Spiderwort, is a species of plant in the dayflower family that is native mainly to the interior highlands of the United States with a disjunct population in Alabama. The plant is also found in Arkansas, Mississippi, Missouri, and Oklahoma.

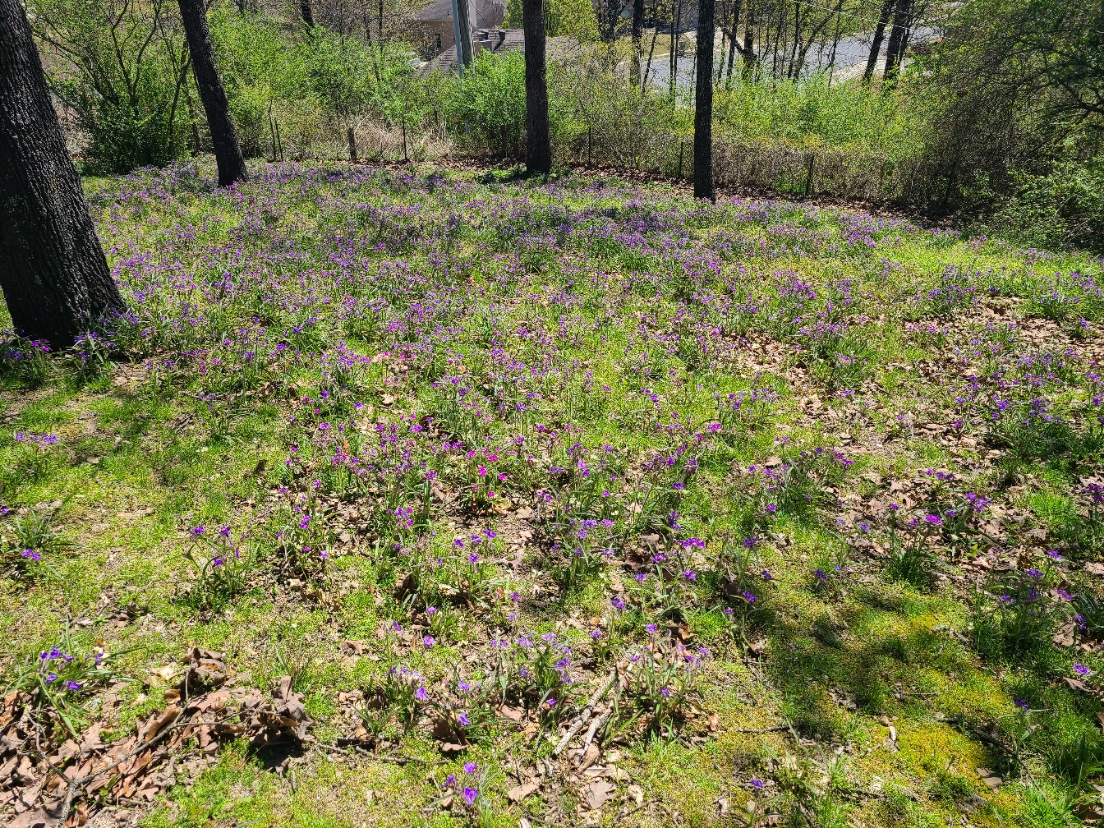
Ernest's Spiderwort exhibiting characteristic clumping behavior.

It is a perennial that produces purple or blue flowers in the spring on herbaceous stems.
