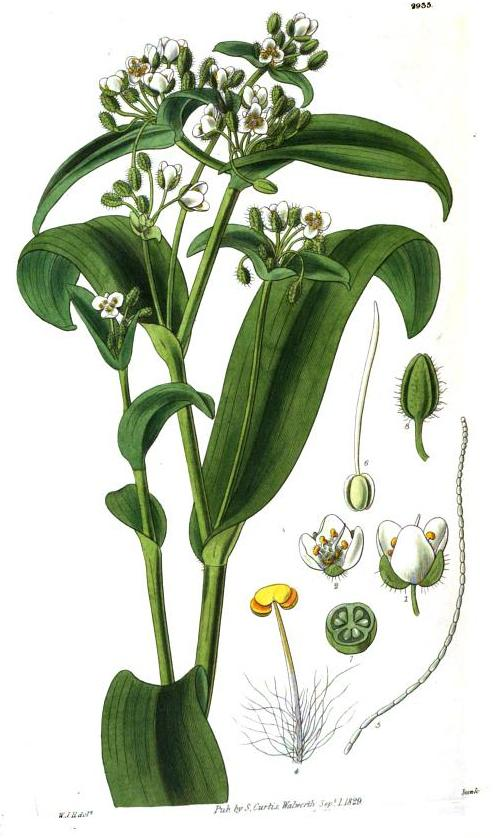
- Tradescantia crassula

Scientific classification
- Kingdom: Plantae
- Clade: Tracheophytes
- Clade: Angiosperms
- Clade: Monocots
- Clade: Commelinids
- Order: Commelinales
- Family: Commelinaceae
- Subfamily: Commelinoideae
- Tribe: Tradescantieae
- Subtribe: Tradescantiinae
- Genus: Tradescantia
- Species: T. crassula

Binomial name
- Tradescantia crassula Link & Otto

= Tradescantia crassula =

Species of flowering plant

Tradescantia crassula, common names succulent spiderwort and white-flowered tradescantia, is a species of plants in the Commelinaceae. It is native to southeastern Brazil, Uruguay, and the Misiones Province of Argentina, and has been introduced to Florida. It flowers in May in Florida, and can be found under Oak Trees.

The plants stem is 3 feet (0.91 m) long, usually green, but sometimes purple in color. Its leaves are 4–9 inches (100–230 mm) long. When first described in 1828, the native range of the plant was unknown.
