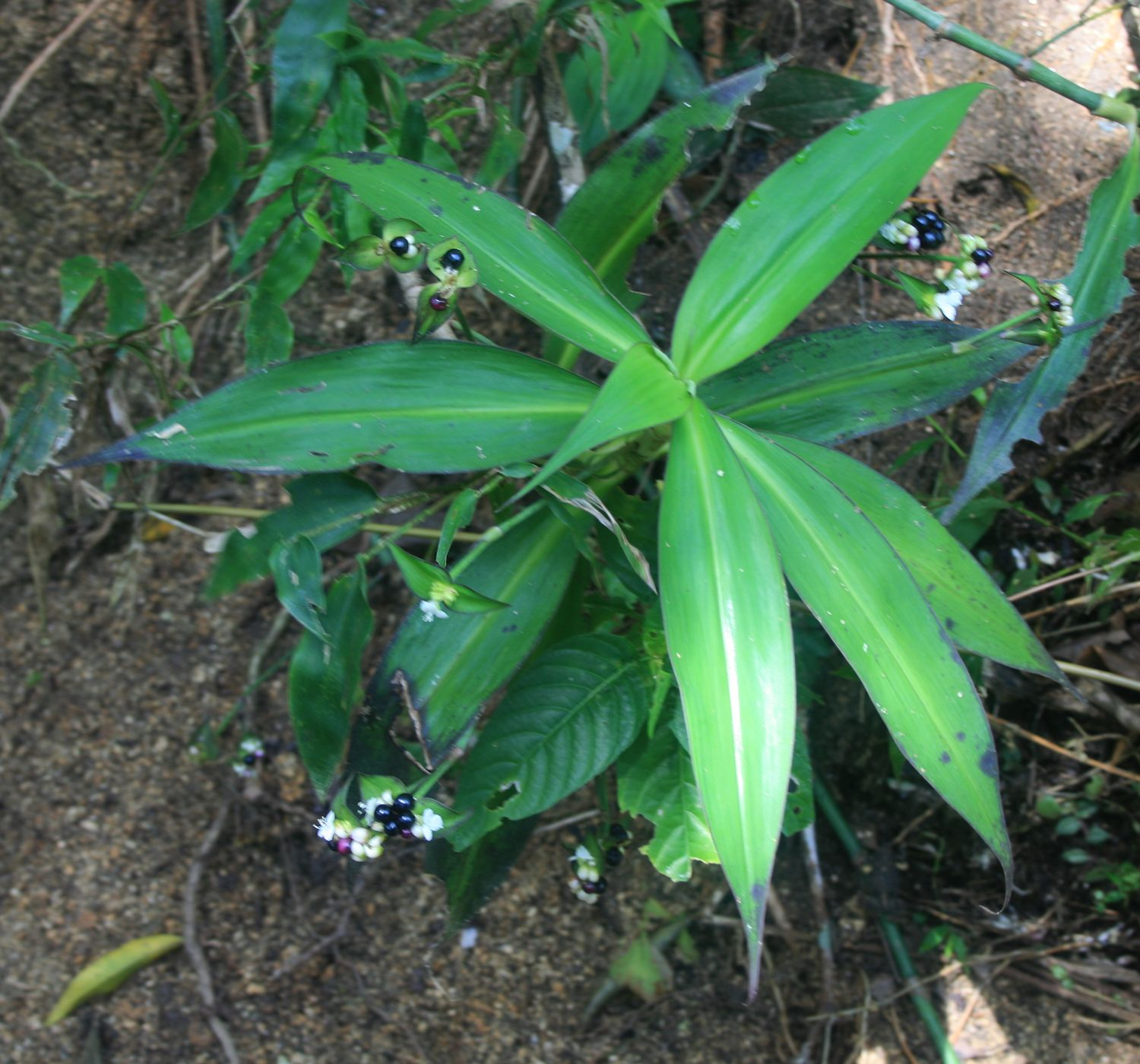

Scientific classification
- Kingdom: Plantae
- Clade: Tracheophytes
- Clade: Angiosperms
- Clade: Monocots
- Clade: Commelinids
- Order: Commelinales
- Family: Commelinaceae
- Genus: Tradescantia
- Species: T. zanonia

Binomial name
- Tradescantia zanonia (L.) Sw. (1788)

Synonyms
- Synonymy: Campelia bibracteata (Cramer) Wied-Neuw. (1820); Campelia boucheana Schult. & Schult.f. (1830); Campelia fastigiata Schltdl. (1852); Campelia fendleri Hassk. (1865); Campelia glabrata Kunth (1843); Campelia hoffmannii Hassk. (1865); Campelia mexicana Mart. ex Kunth (1843); Campelia pseudozanonia Kunth (1843); Campelia scandens Hassk. (1865); Campelia zanonia (L.) Kunth (1816); Campelia zanonia var. glabrata (Kunth) C.B.Clarke (1881); Campelia zanonia var. sessilis C.B.Clarke (1903); Commelina zanonia L. (1753); Gonatandra tradescantioides Schltdl. (1851); Sarcoperis bibracteata (Cramer) Raf. (1837); Tradescantia capitata Sessé & Moc. (1894), nom. illeg.; Tradescantia capitata Vell. (1829), nom. illeg.; Tradescantia gentianifolia Salisb. (1796); Tradescantia gonatandra Schltdl. (1851); Zanonia bibracteata Cramer (1803)

= Tradescantia zanonia =

Species of plant

Tradescantia zanonia, formerly known as Campelia zanonia, is an evergreen perennial subshrub of the dayflower family, closely related to Tradescantia zebrina. It is native to the tropical Americas, ranging from Mexico through Central America and the Caribbean to Bolivia and southern Brazil. Its common names include cañagria, cascajo flor, cinta, rascadera, and suelda.

Its capsule is covered by the fleshy purple-black calyx, hence a berry-like appearance.

It is cultivated as a greenhouse ornamental. There is a variegated cultivar named 'Mexican Flag'.

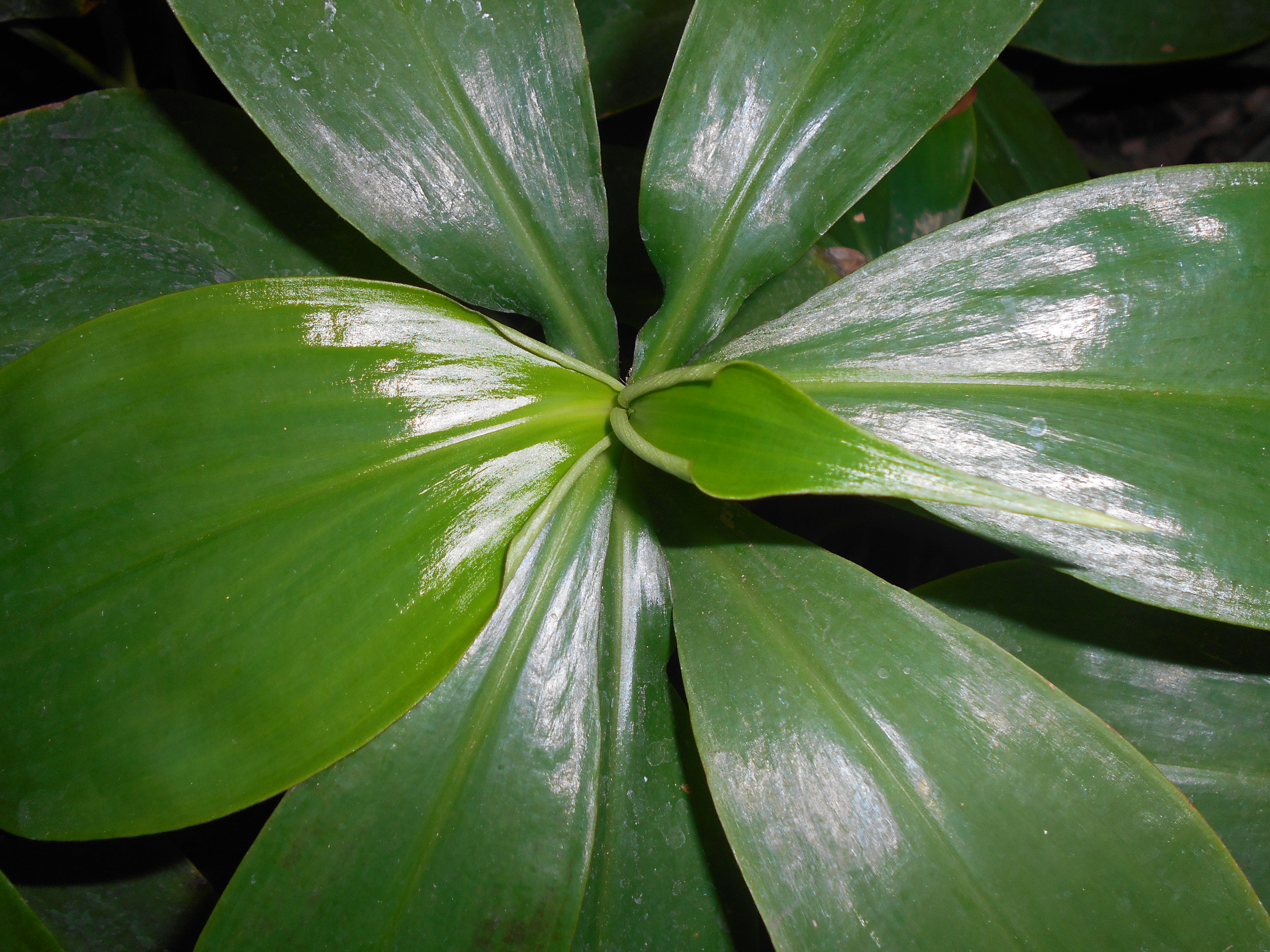
Green leaves

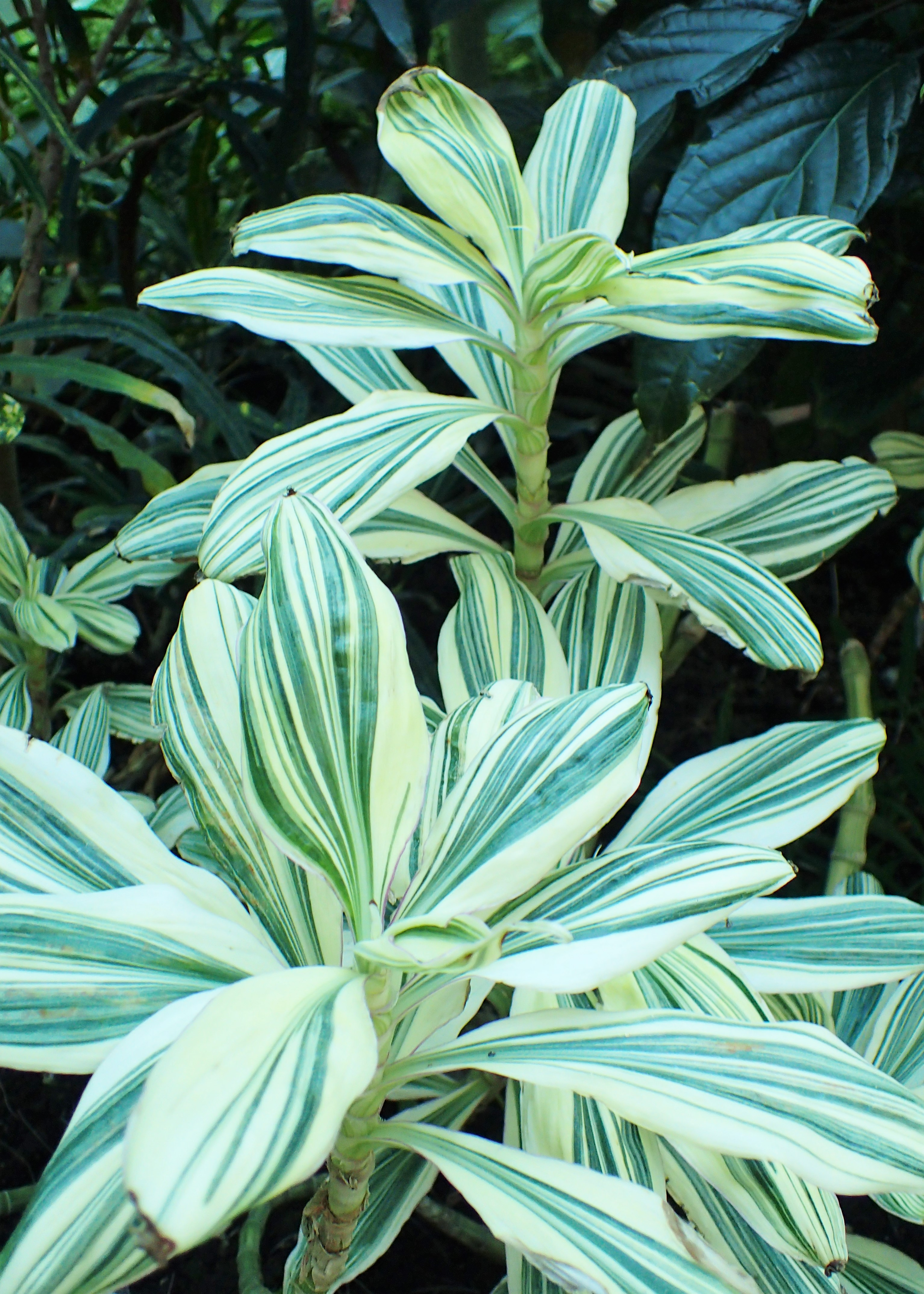
'Mexican Flag'

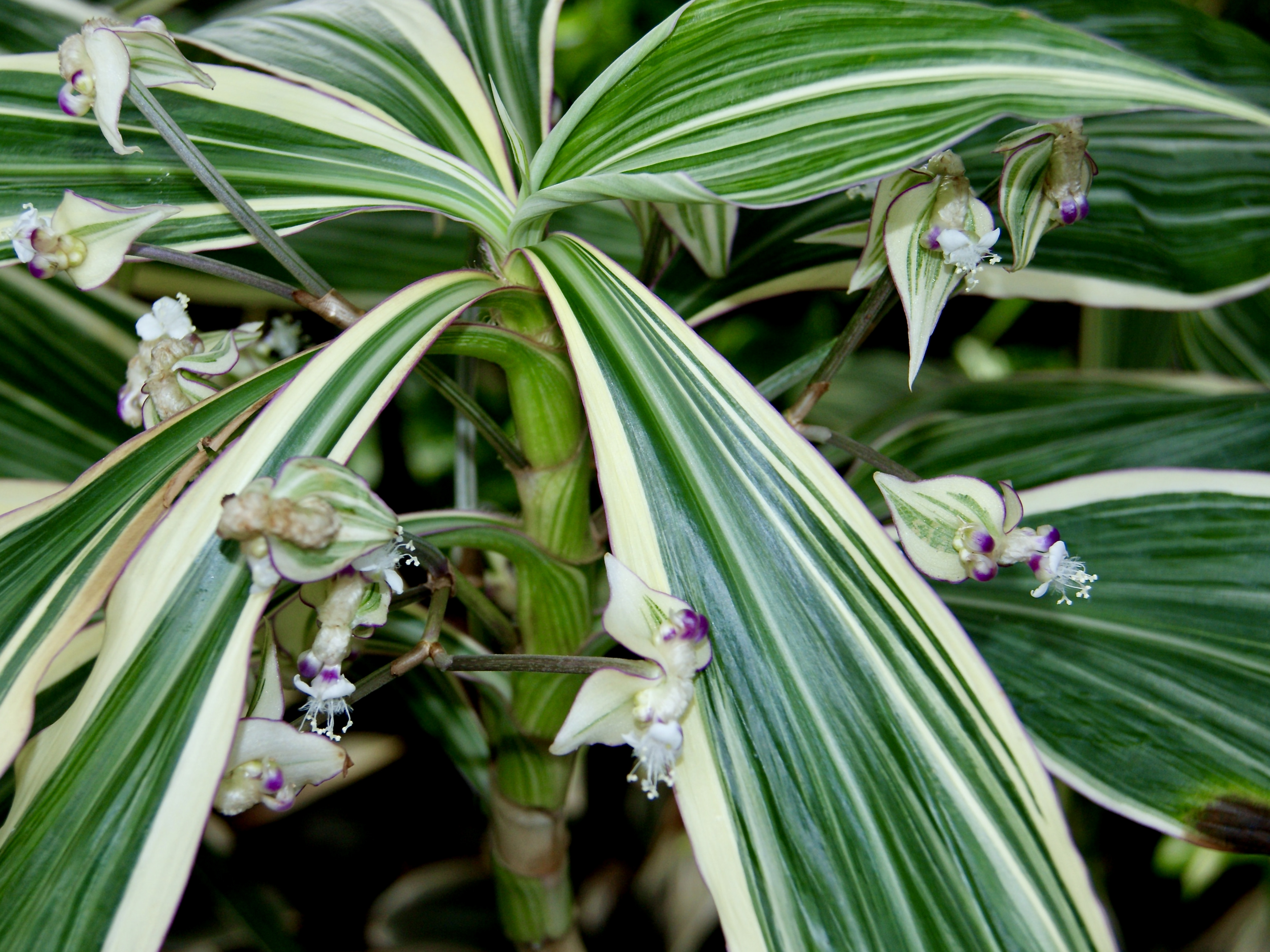
A blooming plant of 'Mexican Flag'

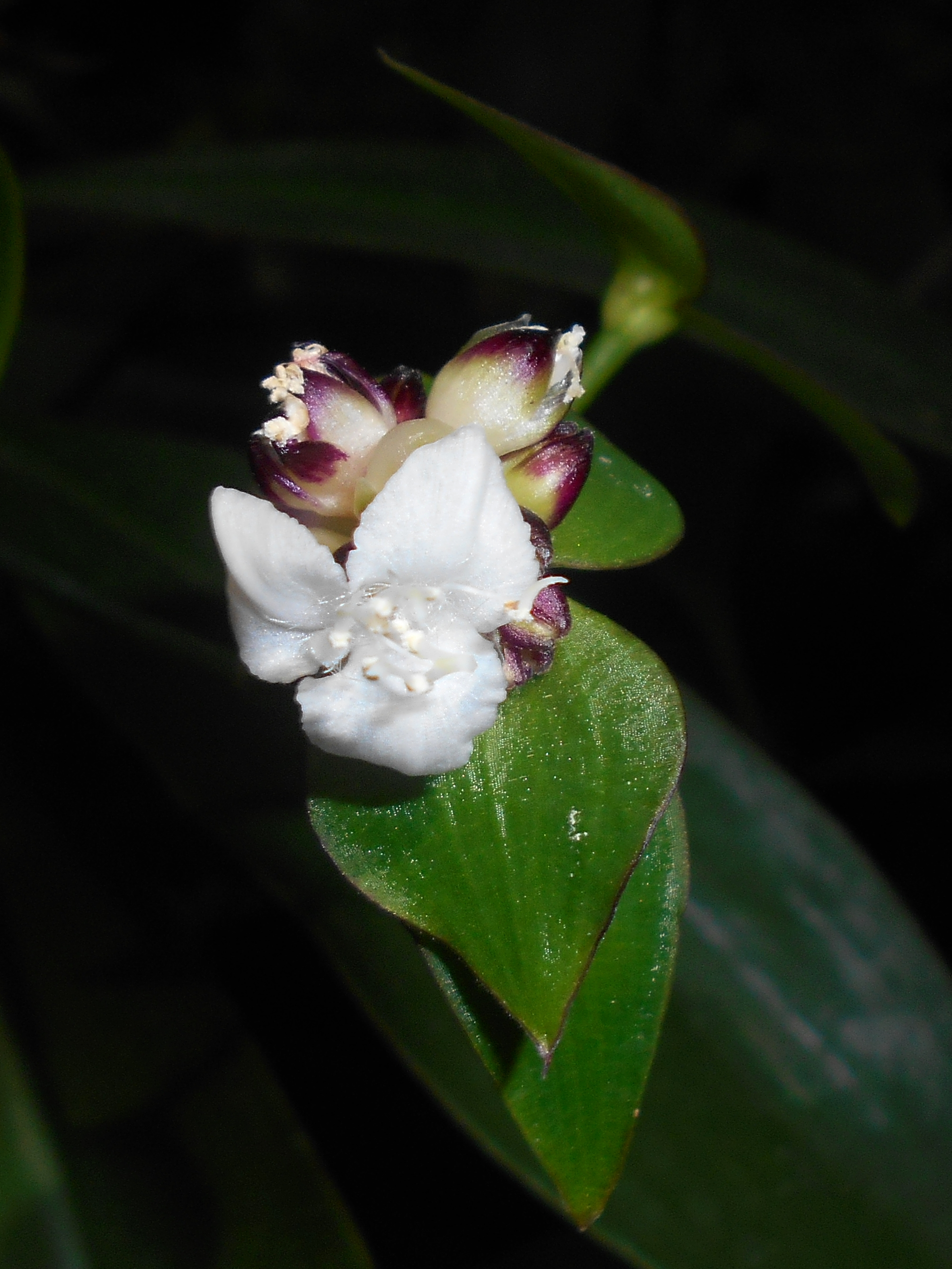
Flower

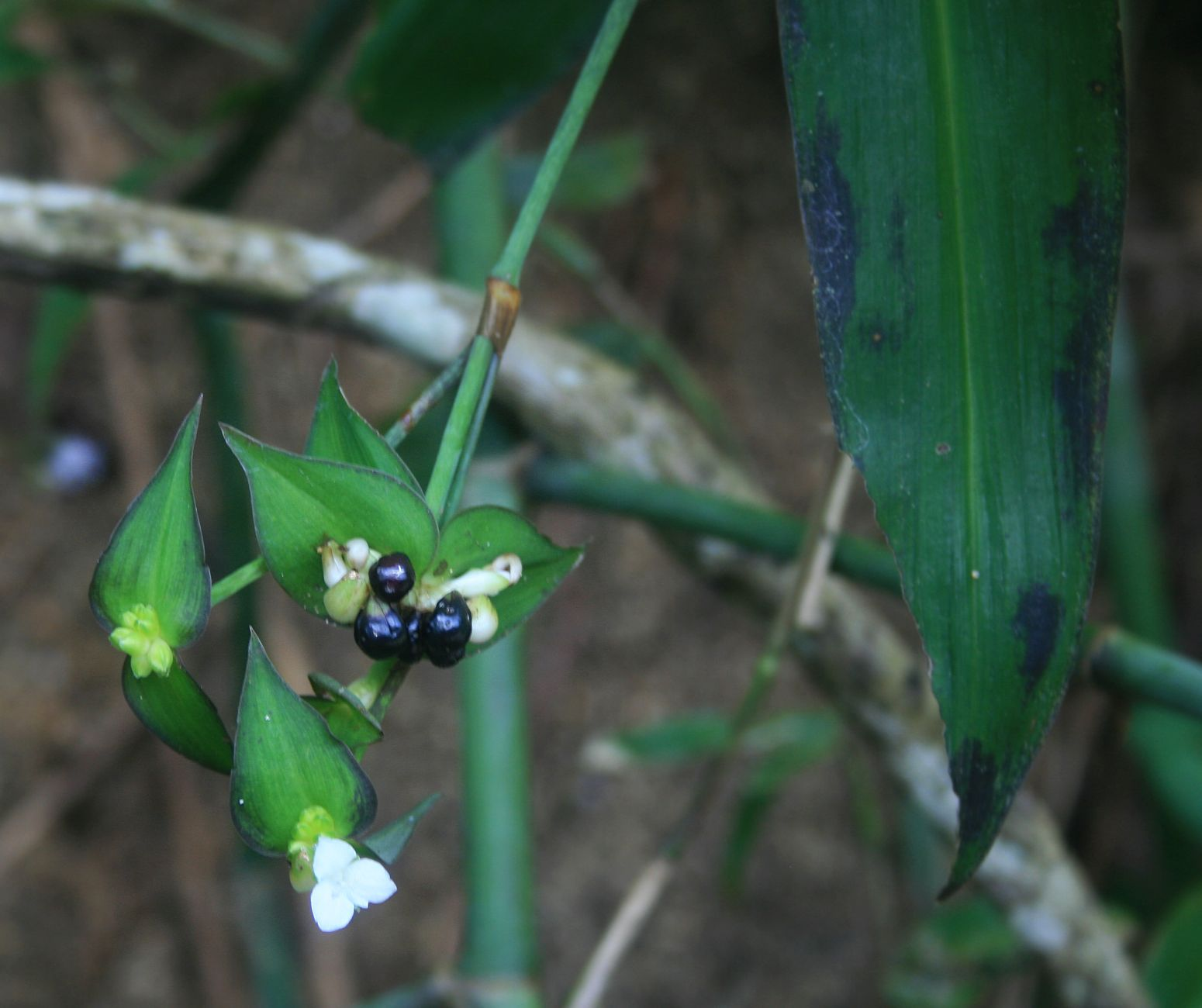
Berry-like capsules
