= C. cristata =

C. cristata may refer to:

- Belah, Casuarina cristata, species of flowering plant in the family Casuarinaceae
- The blue jay (Cyanocitta cristata), species of passerine bird in the family Corvidae
- The hooded seal (Cystophora cristata), species of phocid
- The red-legged seriema (Cariama cristata), species of terrestrial bird in the seriema family
- The great blue turaco (Corythaeola cristata), bird species of the family Musophagidae
- Clavulina cristata, white- or light-colored edible coral mushroom
- The crested coua (Coua cristata), medium sized bird member of the cuckoo family
- Coelogyne cristata, epiphytic orchid
- Cyanotis cristata, species of perennial plants in the family Commelinaceae
- Celosia cristata, a former name for Celosia argentea var. cristata
