= Pussy ears =

Pussy ears is a common name for several plants and may refer to:

- Calochortus tolmiei, in the family Liliaceae and native to the western United States
- Cyanotis somaliensis, in the family Commelinaceae and native to Somalia, cultivated as a houseplant
- Kalanchoe tomentosa, in the family Crassulaceae and native to Madagascar, cultivated as a houseplant
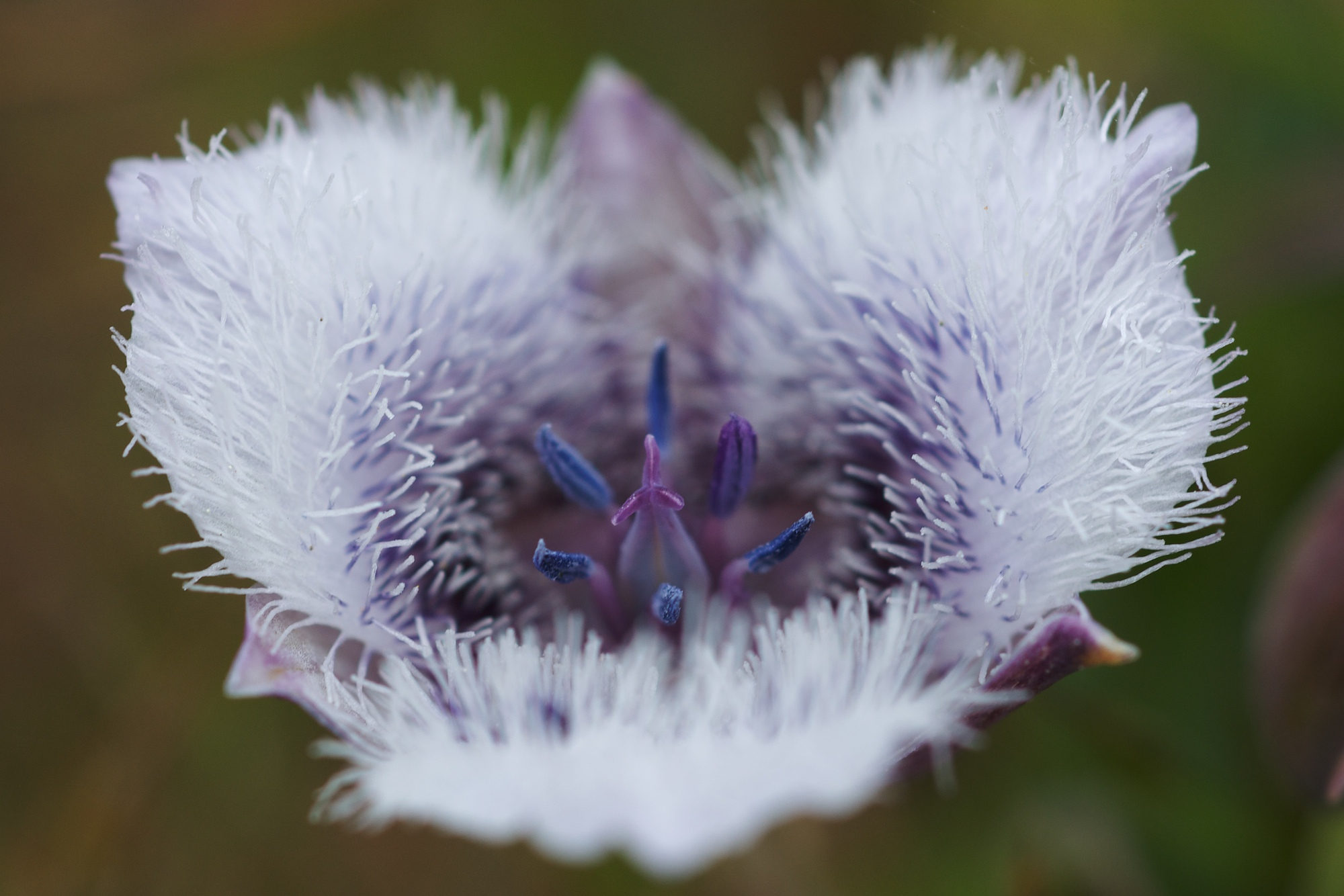
Flower of Calochortus tolmiei

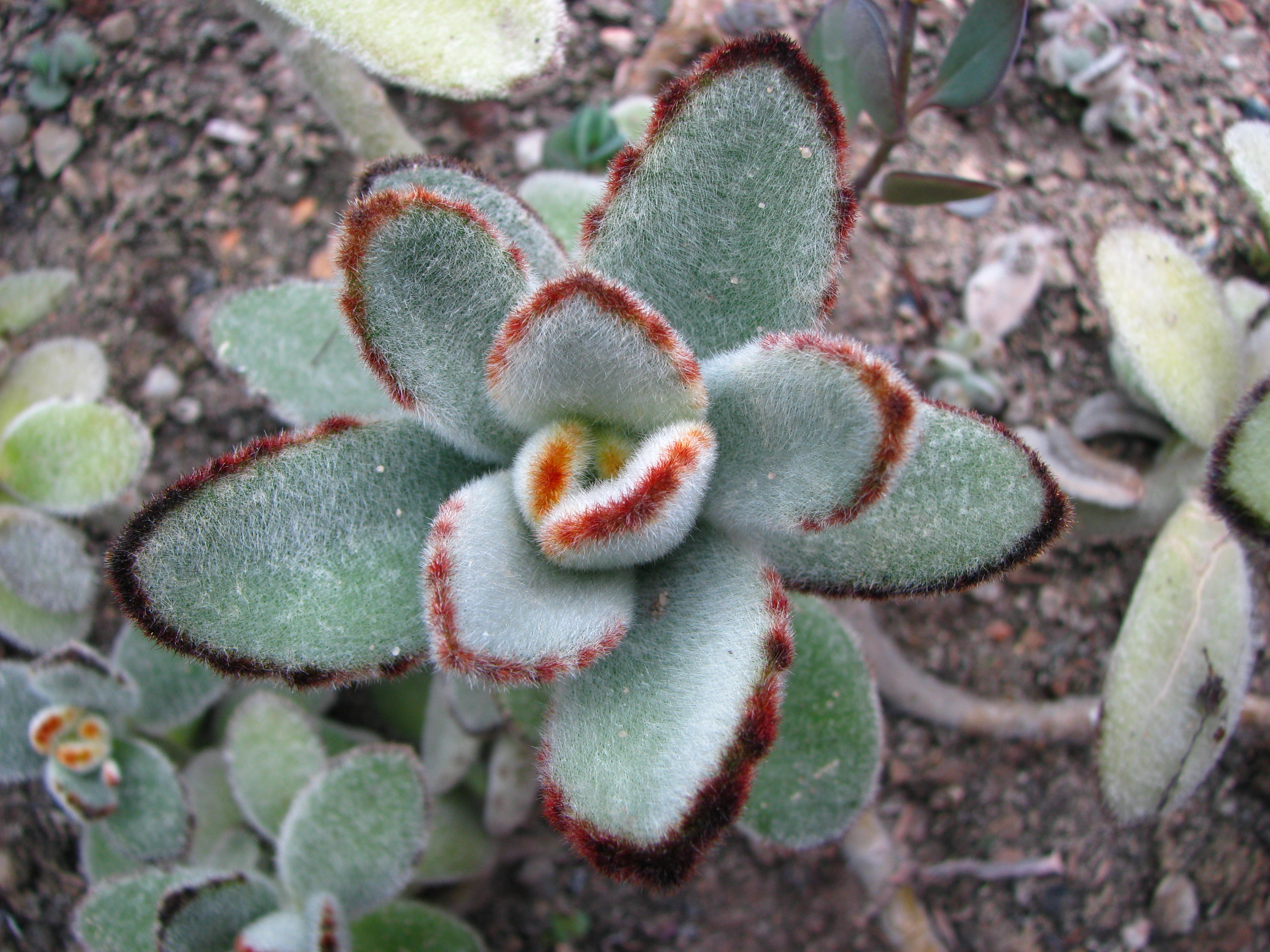
Kalanchoe tomentosa
