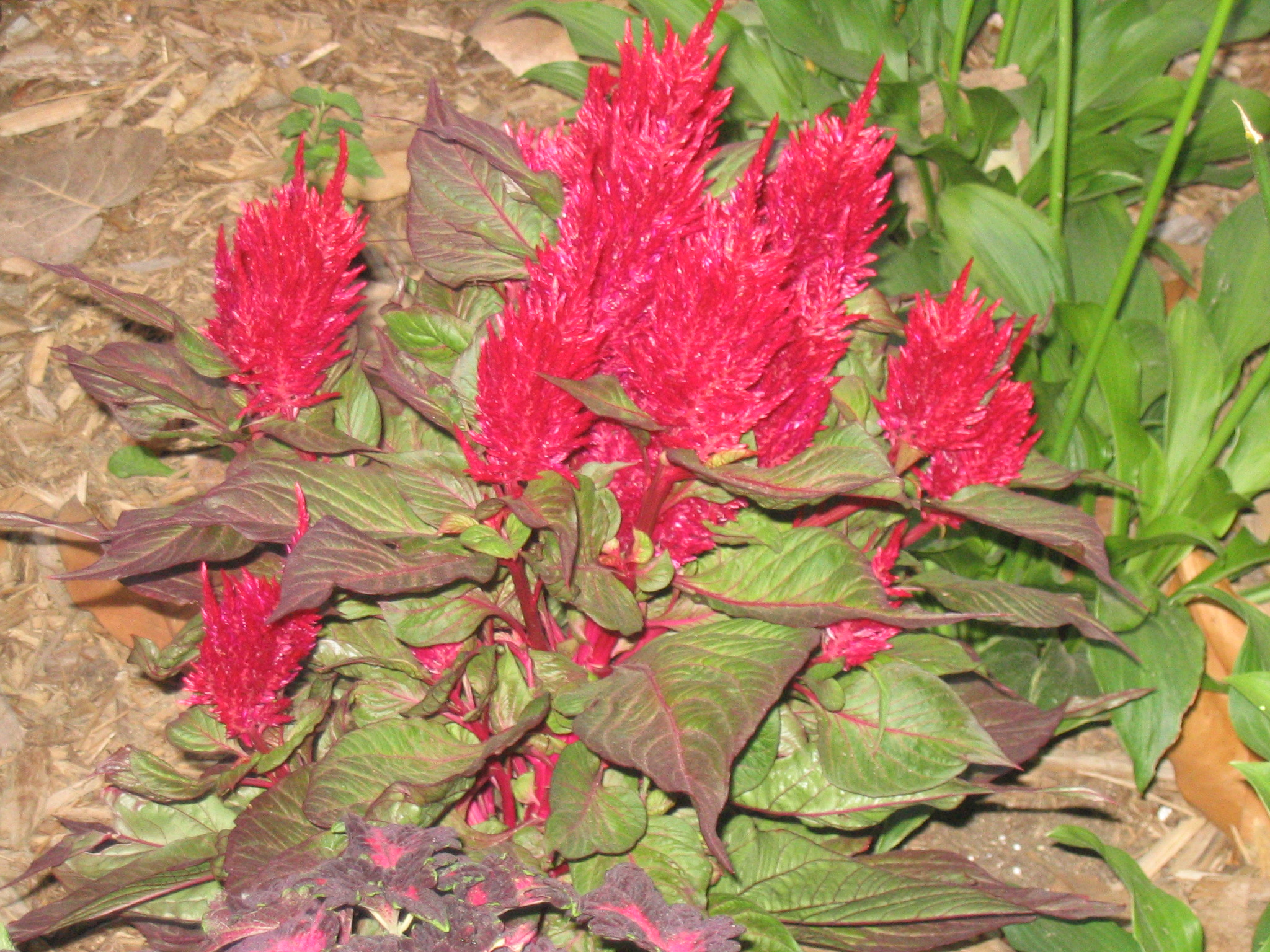

Scientific classification
- Kingdom: Plantae
- Clade: Embryophytes
- Clade: Tracheophytes
- Clade: Spermatophytes
- Clade: Angiosperms
- Clade: Eudicots
- Order: Caryophyllales
- Family: Amaranthaceae
- Genus: Celosia
- Species: C. argentea

Binomial name
- Celosia argentea L.

Synonyms
- Synonyms list: Amaranthus cristatus Noronha; Amaranthus huttonii H.J.Veitch; Amaranthus purpureus Nieuwl.; Amaranthus pyramidalis Noronha; Celosia aurea T.Moore; Celosia castrensis L.; Celosia coccinea L.; Celosia comosa Retz.; Celosia cristata L.; Celosia debilis S.Moore; Celosia huttonii Mast.; Celosia japonica Houtt.; Celosia japonica Mart.; Celosia margaritacea L.; Celosia marylandica Retz.; Celosia pallida Salisb.; Celosia plumosa (Voss) Burv.; Celosia purpurea J.St.-Hil.; Celosia purpurea A.St.-Hil. ex Steud.; Celosia pyramidalis Burm.f.; Celosia splendens Schumach. & Thonn.; Celosia swinhoei Hemsl.; Chamissoa margaritacea (L.) Schouw.

= Celosia argentea =

Species of edible flowering plant

Celosia argentea, commonly known as the plumed cockscomb or silver cock's comb, is a herbaceous plant of tropical origin in the family Amaranthaceae from tropical Africa. The plant is known for its very bright colors. In India and China it is known as a troublesome weed.

== Description ==
Celosia argentea is a tender annual that is often grown in gardens, it can also grow perennially. It blooms in mid-spring to summer. The plant exhibits dodecaploidy.

The flowers are tiny and hermaphrodite, they are packed in narrow, pyramidal, plume-like heads 4–10 inches (10–25 cm) long with vivid colors including shades of orange, red, purple, yellow and cream.

It is propagated by black seeds. The seeds come in capsules; they are extremely small, up to 43,000 seeds per ounce.

== Cultivation ==
A plant of tropical origin, they grow best in full sunlight and should be placed in a well-drained area. Full sunlight means they should get at least 8 hours of direct sunlight. For healthy growth plant them in the area where they get early morning sunlight and afternoon shade. In the afternoon the sunlight is mostly harsh especially in hot summer. Afternoon shade will save the plant from excessive heat. The flowerheads can last up to 8 weeks, and further growth can be promoted by removing dead flowers.

=== Cultivars ===
Celosia argentea var. cristata 'Flamingo Feathers' is a cultivar that can grow up to 2 feet in height. The colors are predominantly pink to light violet, and the leaves are a darker green than other cultivars. The Century cultivars are usually taller (1–2 feet), and are bright red, yellow, orange, or pink. The Kimono cultivars are generally smaller (4 inches – 1 foot), and have more muted colors, though similar to the Century cultivars. Other colors, such as white, burgundy, orange-red, etc., can be found. Certain varieties will grow to 3–4 feet in height. Celosia plumosa, also known as Prince of Wales feathers, is a synonym for Celosia argentea. Seeds may be sold as mixtures.

The following strains have gained the Royal Horticultural Society's Award of Garden Merit (confirmed in 2017):

- C. argentea var. cristata (Plumosa Group) 'Smart Look Red'
- C. argentea var. cristata (Plumosa Group) 'Fresh Look Orange' (Fresh Look Group)
- C. argentea var. cristata (Plumosa Group) 'Glow Red'
- C. argentea var. cristata (Plumosa Group) 'Century Rose' (Century Group)
- C. argentea var. cristata (Spicata Group) 'Flamingo Feather'

== Uses ==
It is used in Africa to help control the growth of the parasitic Striga plant. It can also be used in soaps.

=== Food ===
The leaves and flowers are edible and are grown for such use particularly in west Africa and Southeast Asia. Celosia argentea var. argentea or "Lagos spinach" is one of the main boiled greens in West Africa, where it is known as soko yòkòtò (Yoruba) or farar áláyyafó (Hausa).

== Images ==
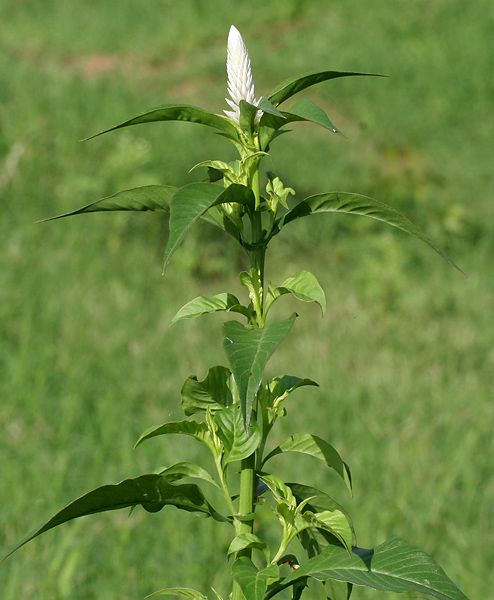
Silver cockscomb Celosia argentea

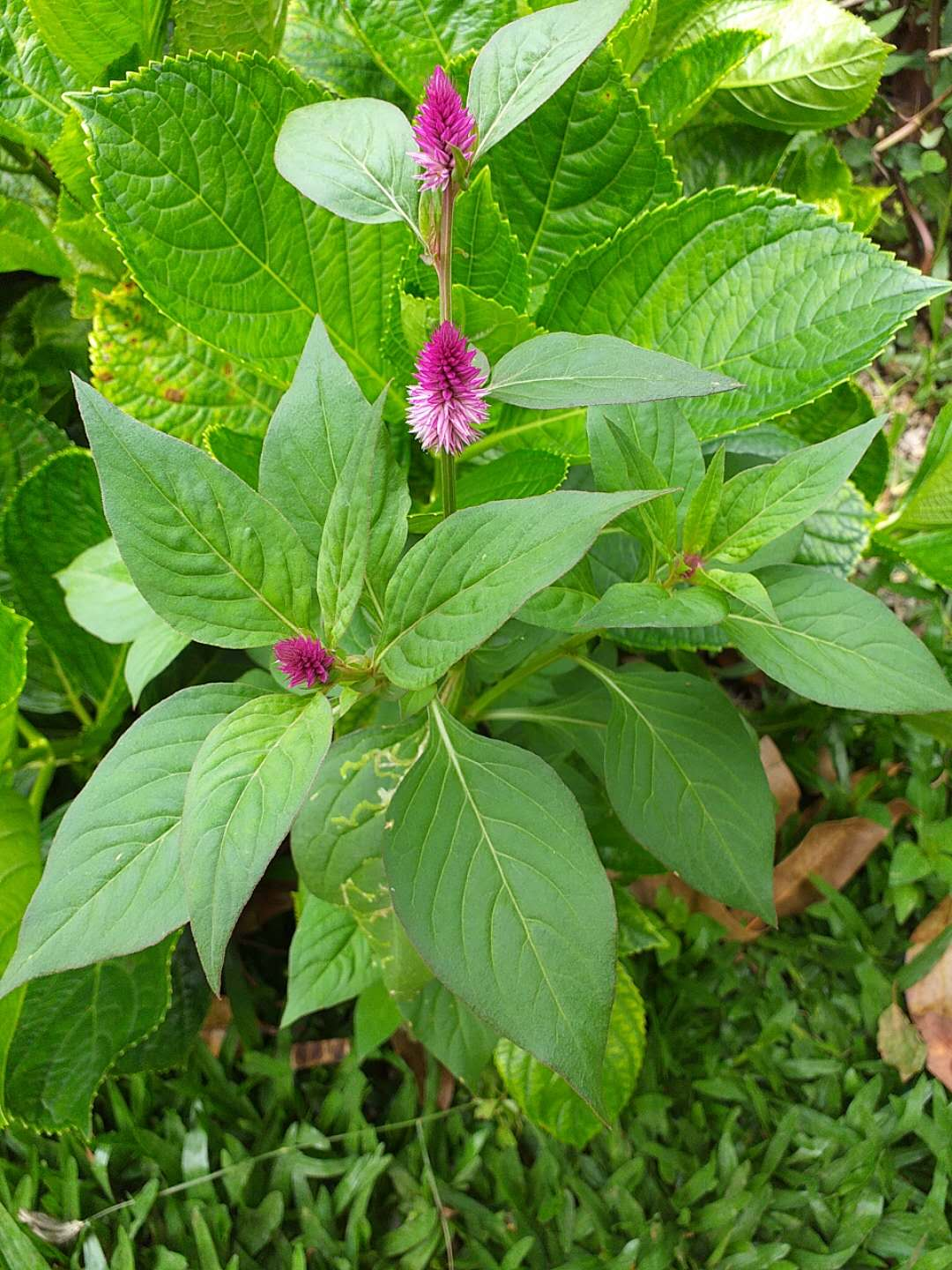
Celosia argentea. 2018 Taichung World Flora Exposition, Taiwan.

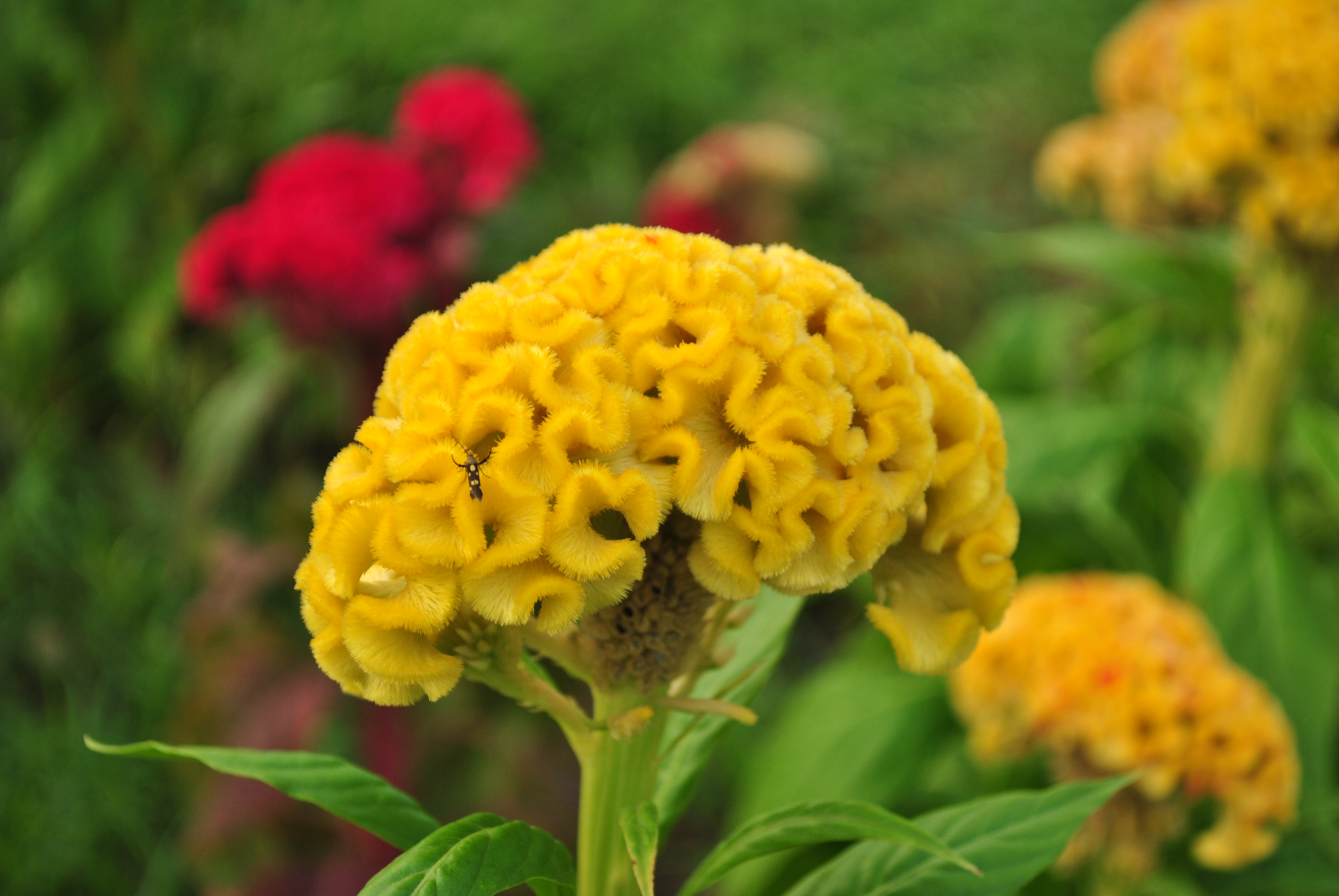
Celosia cristata

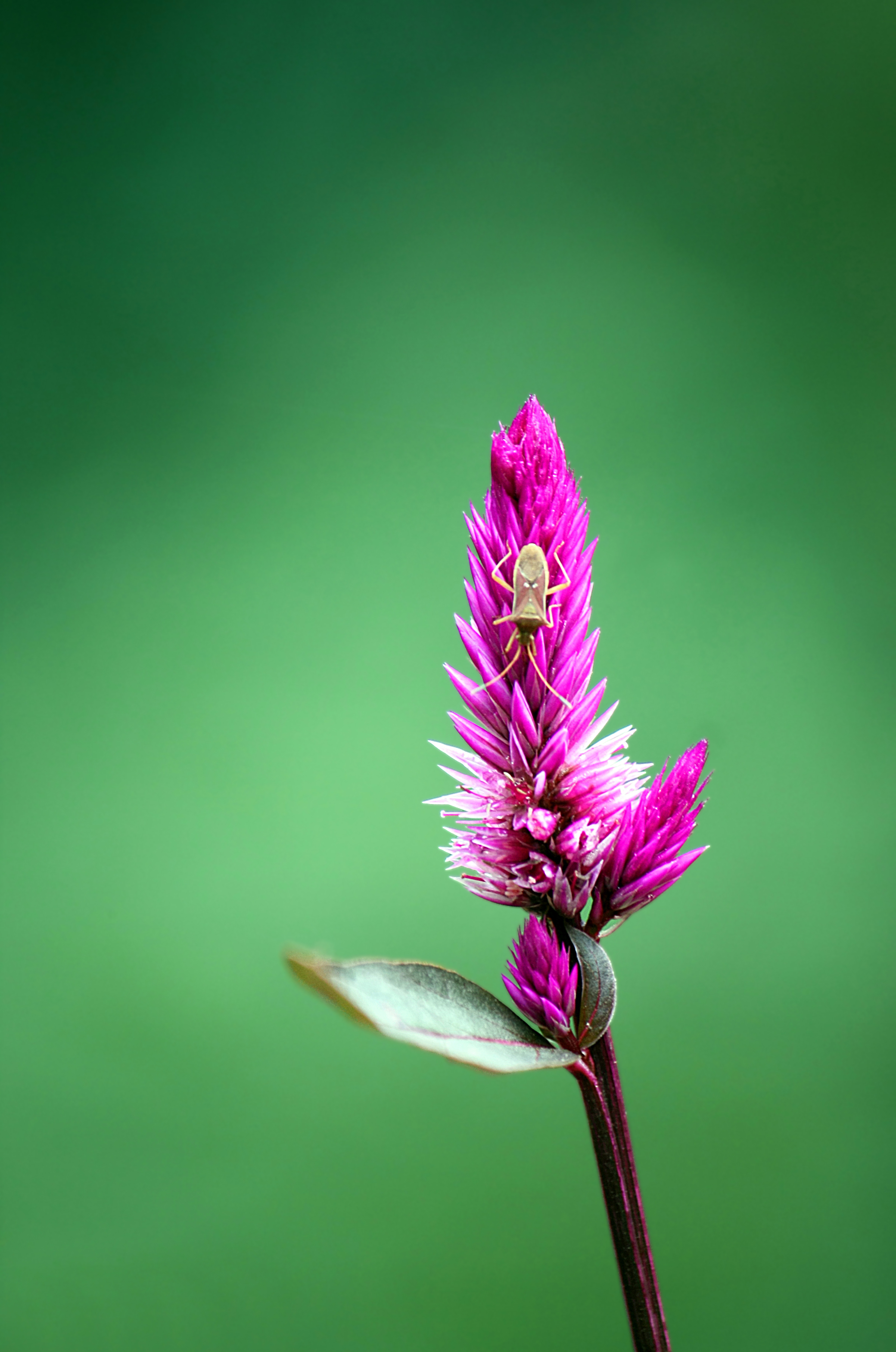
Plumed cockscomb flower and an insect on it.

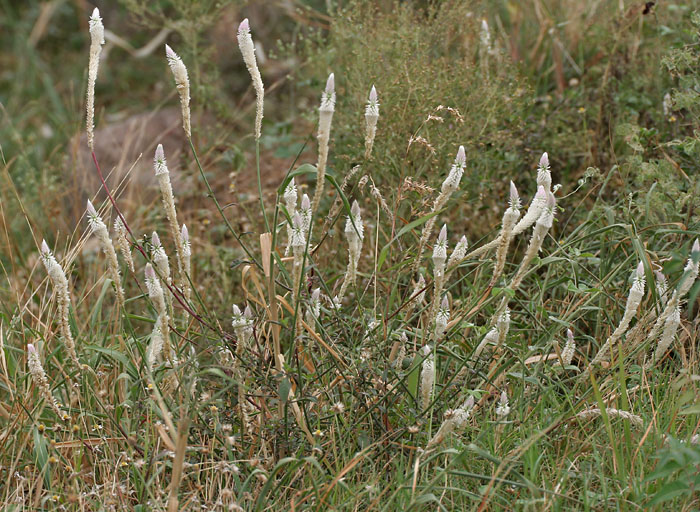
Around the fields in Hyderabad, India

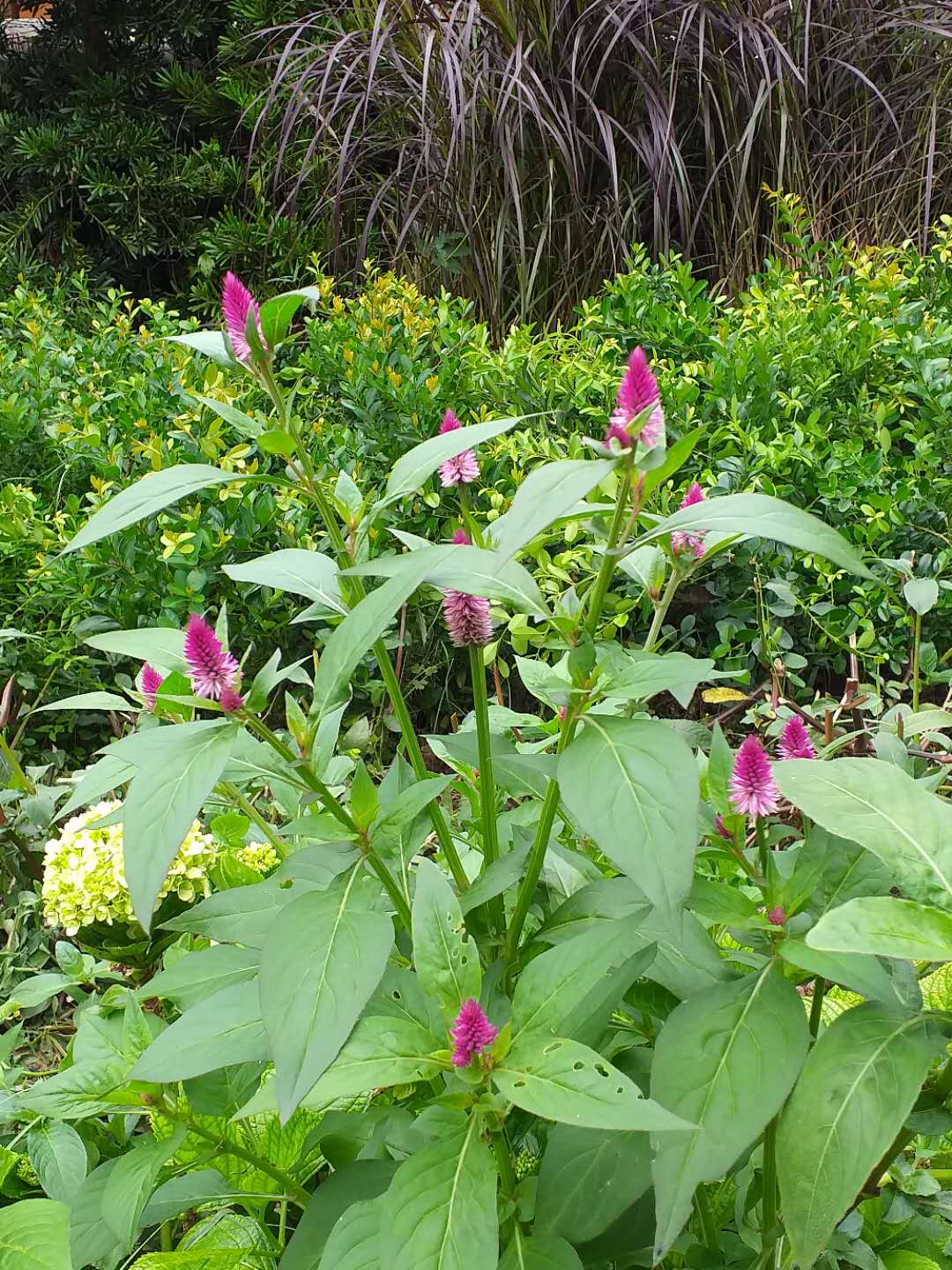
Celosia argentea. 2018 Taichung World Flora Exposition, Taiwan.

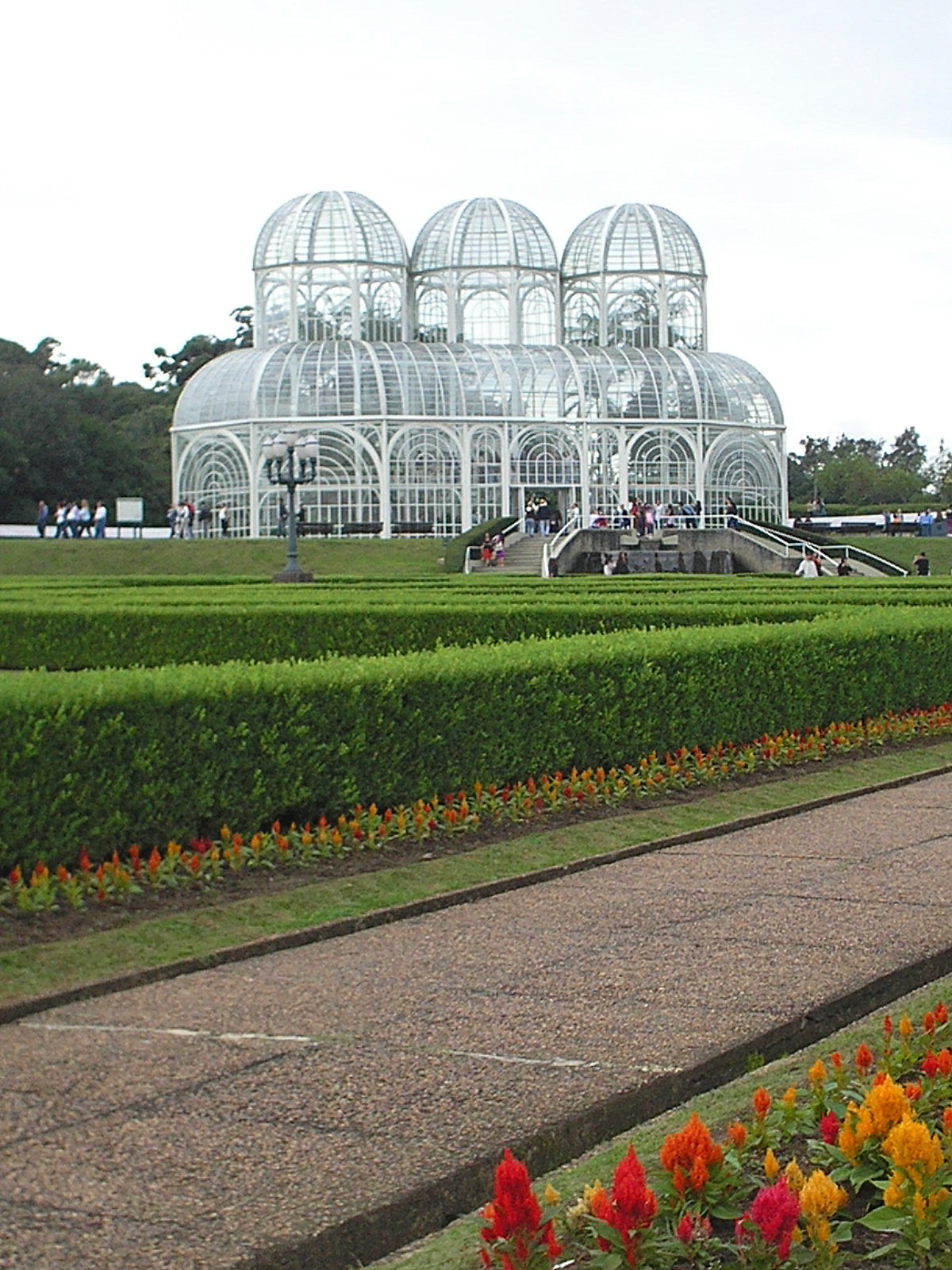
Colored varieties used as ornamental plant in the Botanical Garden of Curitiba, Southern Brazil

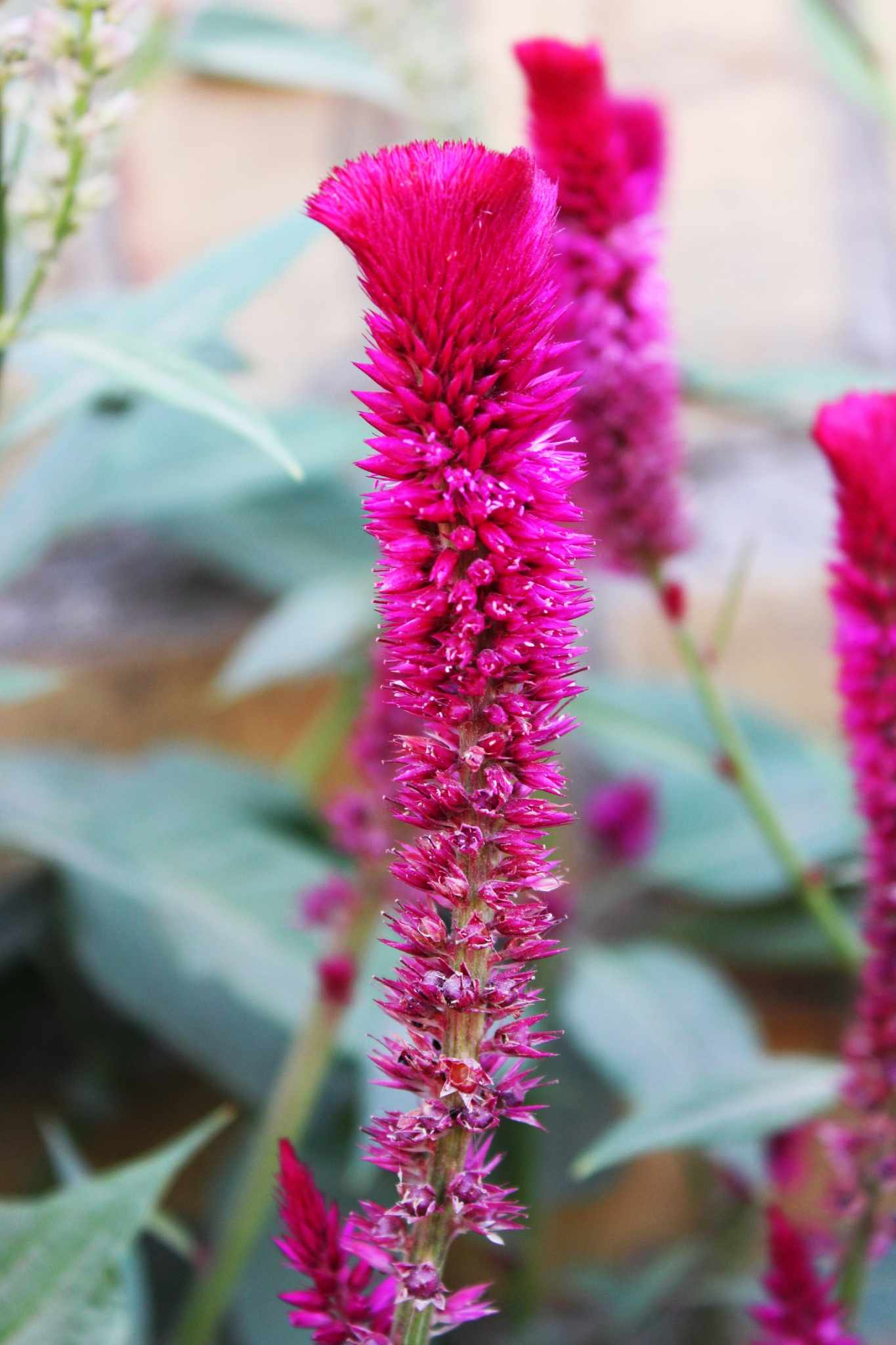
Celosia argentea, Serbia

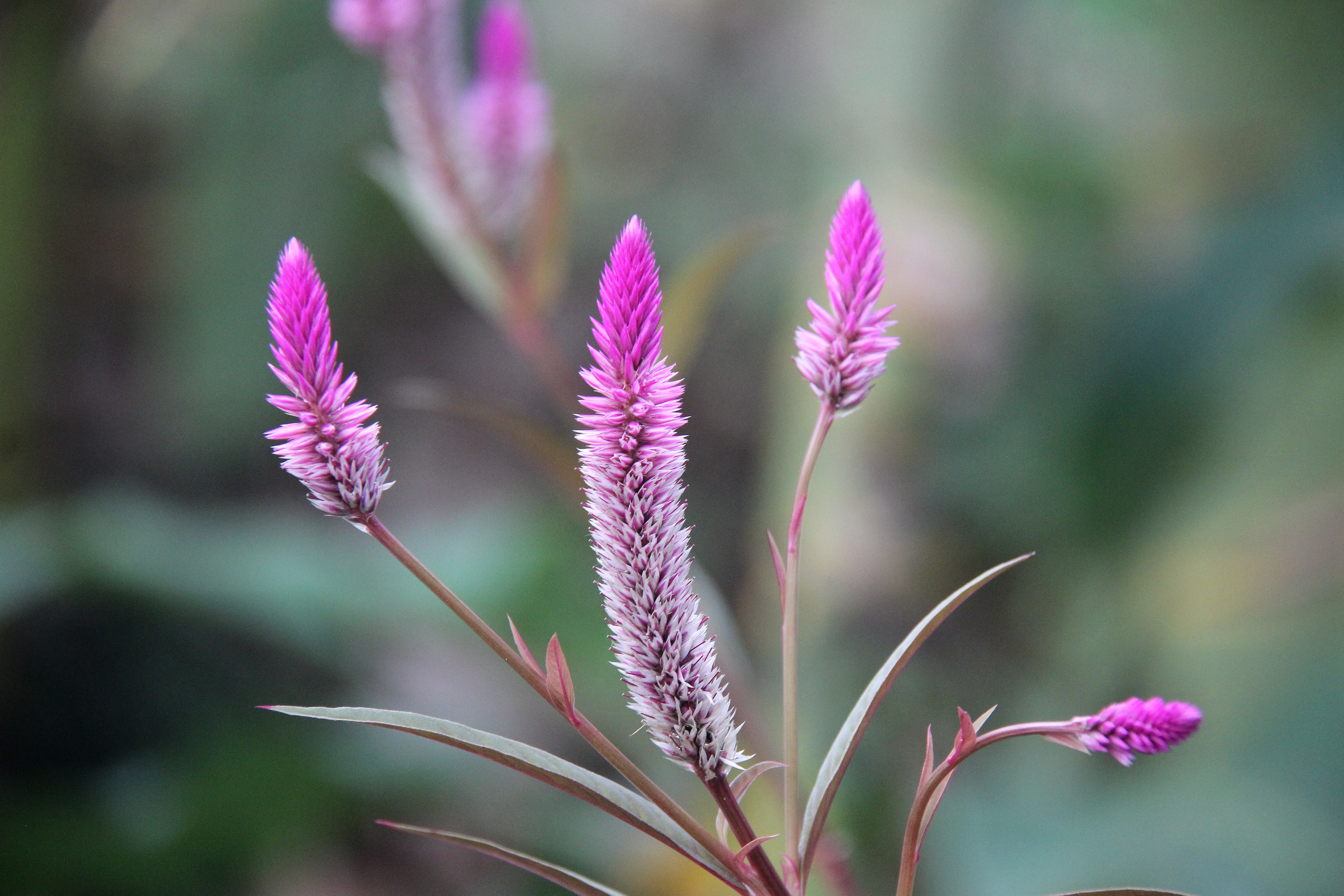
Celosia argentea, Philippines

== See also ==
- Celosia cristata
