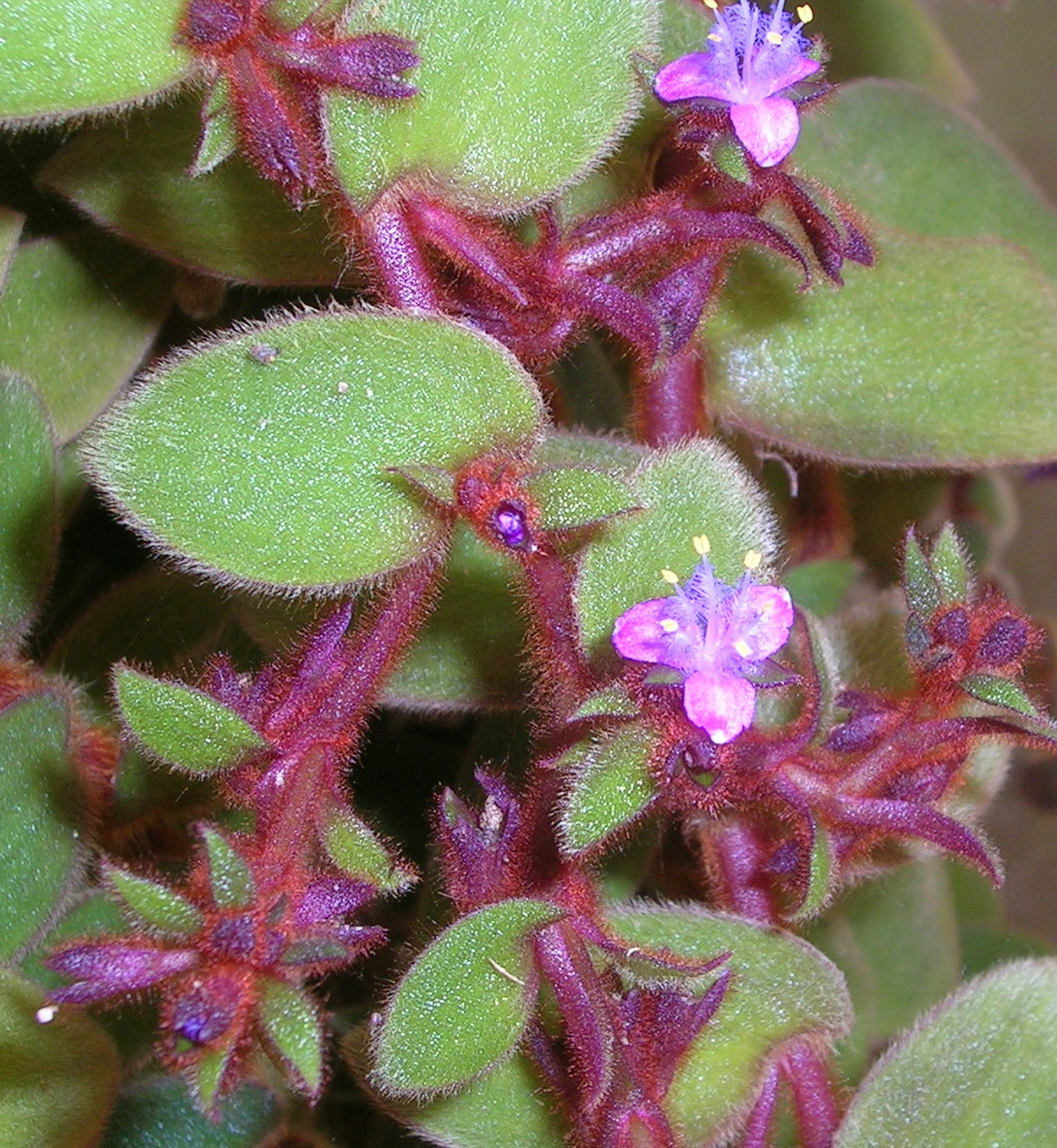
- Close-up of flowers

Scientific classification
- Kingdom: Plantae
- Clade: Embryophytes
- Clade: Tracheophytes
- Clade: Angiosperms
- Clade: Monocots
- Clade: Commelinids
- Order: Commelinales
- Family: Commelinaceae
- Genus: Cyanotis
- Species: C. beddomei

Binomial name
- Cyanotis beddomei (Hook.f.) Erhardt, Götz & Seybold

Synonyms
- List: Belosynapsis kewensis Hassk.; Cyanotis kewensis C.B.Clarke; Cyanotis kewoides Christenh. & Byng; Erythrotis beddomei Hook.f.; Tonningia kewensis (C.B.Clarke) Kuntze

= Cyanotis beddomei =

Species of flowering plant

Cyanotis beddomei, the teddy bear vine, is a species of flowering plant in the family Commelinaceae, native to Kerala and Tamil Nadu states in southern India. It has gained the Royal Horticultural Society's Award of Garden Merit. It may be synonymous with Belosynapsis kewensis.
