= Cyanotis vivipara =

Scientific classification
- Kingdom: Plantae
- Clade: Tracheophytes
- Clade: Angiosperms
- Clade: Monocots
- Clade: Commelinids
- Order: Commelinales
- Family: Commelinaceae
- Genus: Cyanotis
- Species: C. vivipara

Binomial name
- Cyanotis vivipara Dalzell)

Synonyms
- Belosynapsis vivipara (Dalzell) C.E.C.Fisch.; Dalzellia vivipara (Dalzell) Hassk.; Tonningia vivipara (Dalzell) Kuntze

Species of flowering plant

Cyanotis vivipara is a species of plants in the Commelinaceae family.

== Description ==
The species is an epiphytic, subscapigerous herb measuring 10–25 cm in length. It is covered with scattered rufous spreading hairs or may become glabrescent in younger plants. The rootstock is small.

Leaves: Both radical and cauline leaves are present. Radical leaves measure 3–8 × 1–2 cm, are sessile, linear to linear-lanceolate, with a narrowed base and an acute or acuminate apex. They are covered with pilose hairs. Cauline leaves are smaller, 1–2 × 0.2–0.5 cm, sessile, ovate to elliptic, with an acute apex and a pilose surface.

Scape: The scape is slender, 8–25 cm long, and viviparous at the apex, bearing several small oblong-lanceolate, acute leaves.

Inflorescence: The peduncle bears 2–4 flowers arranged in an umbel arising from the leaf axils. It is pilose and provided with two bracts.

Flowers: Sepals 3, oblong, 2–3 mm long, and villous. Petals 3, white, connate to the middle. Stamens 6, with naked filaments.

Fruit and Seeds: Capsules are oblanceolate, about 3 mm long, obtuse, hairy, and recurved after dehiscence. They are 3-celled, containing two seeds per cell. Seeds are cylindric and smooth.
