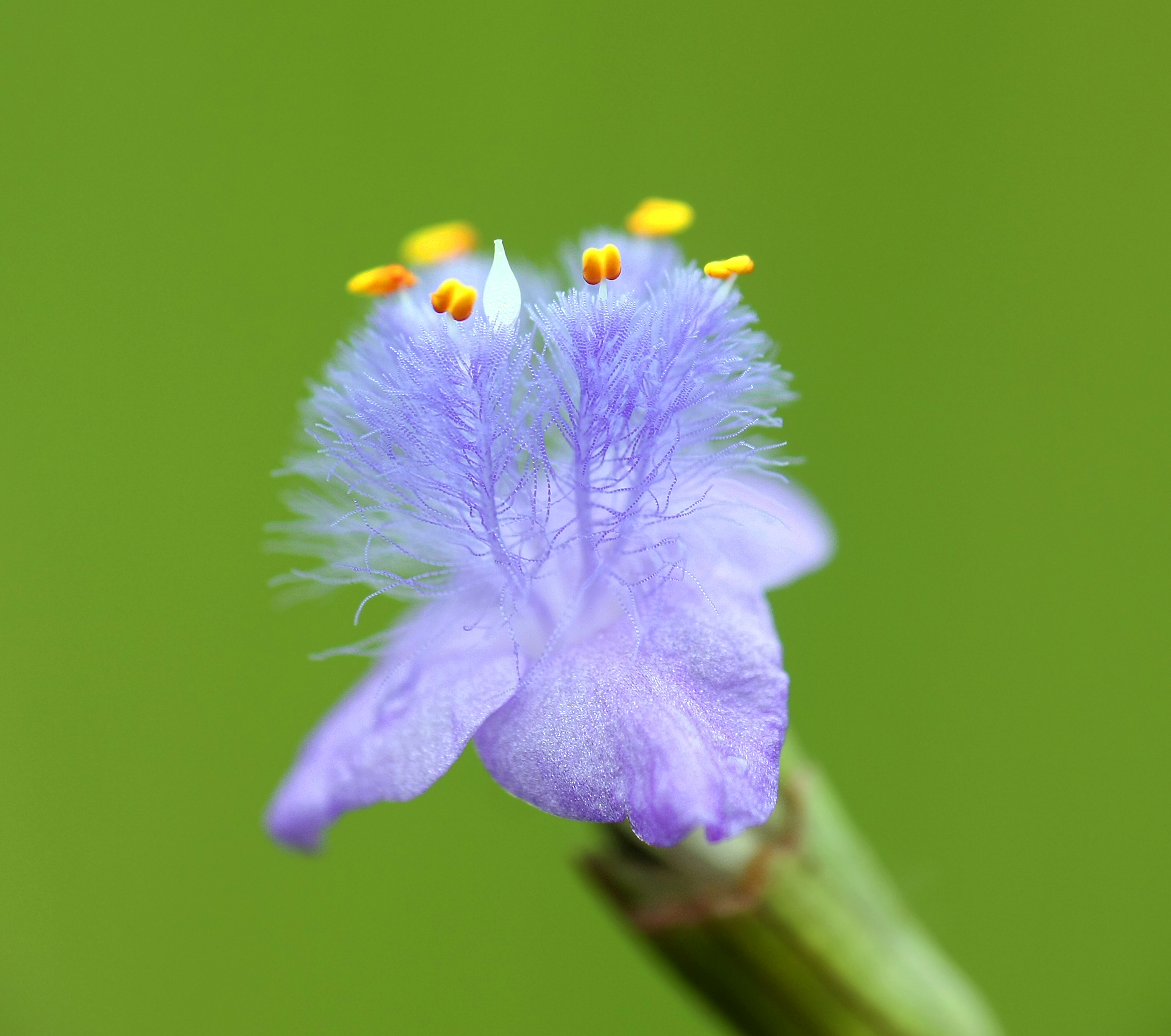
- Cyanotis axillaris flower

Conservation status
- Least Concern (IUCN 3.1)

Scientific classification
- Kingdom: Plantae
- Clade: Tracheophytes
- Clade: Angiosperms
- Clade: Monocots
- Clade: Commelinids
- Order: Commelinales
- Family: Commelinaceae
- Genus: Cyanotis
- Species: C. axillaris

Binomial name
- Cyanotis axillaris (L.) D.Don ex Sweet

Synonyms
- Zygomenes axillaris (L.) Salisb. Tradescantia axillaris (L.) L. Tonningia axillaris (L.) Raf. Tonningia axillaris (L.) Kuntze; Cyanotis disrumpens Hassk. Commelina axillaris L. Amischophacelus axillaris (L.) R.S.Rao & Kammathy

= Cyanotis axillaris =

Species of flowering plant

Cyanotis axillaris is a species of perennial plants in the family Commelinaceae. It is native to Indian Subcontinent, southern China, Southeast Asia and Northern Australia. It grows in monsoon forest, woodland and wooded grassland. It uses medical plant in India and it uses as food for pigs.
