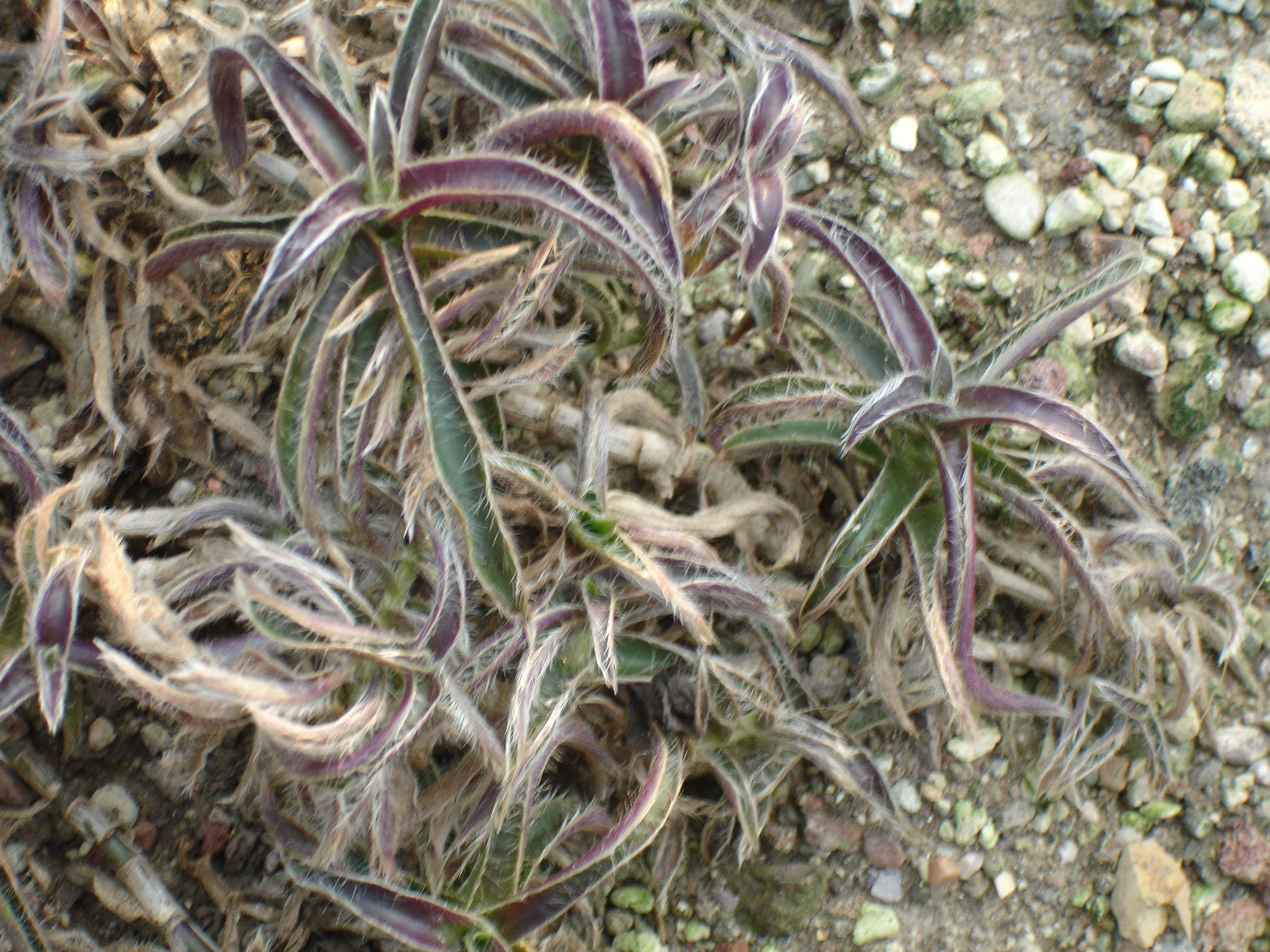
- Cyanotis somaliensis

Scientific classification
- Kingdom: Plantae
- Clade: Tracheophytes
- Clade: Angiosperms
- Clade: Monocots
- Clade: Commelinids
- Order: Commelinales
- Family: Commelinaceae
- Subfamily: Commelinoideae
- Tribe: Tradescantieae
- Subtribe: Cyanotinae
- Genus: Cyanotis; D.Don

Synonyms
- Amischophacelus R.S.Rao & Kammathy; Belosynapsis Hassk.; Cyanopogon Welw. ex C.B.Clarke; Dalzellia Hassk. 1865 not Wight 1852; Erythrotis Hook.f.; Siphostigma Raf.; Tonningia Neck.; Zygomenes Salisb.

= Cyanotis =

Genus of flowering plants

Cyanotis is a genus of mainly perennial plants in the family Commelinaceae, first described in 1825. Species of the genus are native to Africa, southern Asia, and northern Australia.

== Species ==
51 species are accepted.

- Cyanotis adscendens Dalzell – India, Sri Lanka
- Cyanotis ake-assii Brenan – Mali, Ivory Coast
- Cyanotis angusta C.B.Clarke – West Africa
- Cyanotis arachnoidea C.B.Clarke – tropical Africa, Indian Subcontinent, southern China, Indochina
- Cyanotis arcotensis R.S.Rao – southern India
- Cyanotis axillaris (L.) D.Don ex Sweet – Indian Subcontinent, southern China, Southeast Asia, Northern Australia
- Cyanotis beddomei (Hook.f.) Erhardt, Götz & Seybold – southern India
- Cyanotis burmanniana Wight – India, Sri Lanka, Myanmar
- Cyanotis caespitosa Kotschy & Peyr. – tropical Africa
- Cyanotis ceylanica Hassk. – Sri Lanka
- Cyanotis cristata (L.) D.Don – Indian Subcontinent, southern China, Southeast Asia, Ethiopia, Socotra, Mauritius, Java, Philippines
- Cyanotis cucullata (Roth) Kunth – southern India, Myanmar, Thailand
- Cyanotis cupricola J.Duvign. – Zaïre
- Cyanotis deccanensis Yugandhar, Sivaram., Savithr. & L.J.Singh – southern India (Andhra Pradesh)
- Cyanotis dybowskii Hua – Congo-Brazzaville, Central African Republic
- Cyanotis epiphytica Blatt. – southern India
- Cyanotis fasciculata (B.Heyne ex Roth) Schult. & Schult.f. – Indian Subcontinent
- Cyanotis flexuosa C.B.Clarke – Huíla region of Angola
- Cyanotis foecunda DC. ex Hassk – central + eastern Africa and Yemen
- Cyanotis ganganensis Schnell – Guinea
- Cyanotis grandidieri H.Perrier – Madagascar
- Cyanotis hepperi Brenan – Nigeria
- Cyanotis homblei De Wild. – Zaïre
- Cyanotis karliana Hassk. – southern India
- Cyanotis kawakamii Hayata – southern Taiwan
- Cyanotis lanata Benth. – tropical + southern Africa, Yemen
- Cyanotis lanceolata Wight – southern India and Sri Lanka
- Cyanotis lapidosa E.Phillips – South Africa, Eswatini
- Cyanotis longifolia Benth. – tropical Africa
- Cyanotis loureiroana (Schult. & Schult.f.) Merr. – Guangdong, Hainan, Vietnam
- Cyanotis lourensis Schnell – Guinea
- Cyanotis moluccana (Roxb.) Merr. – Malesia and New Guinea
- Cyanotis nyctitropa Deflers – Yemen and Saudi Arabia
- Cyanotis obtusa (Trimen) Trimen - southern India and Sri Lanka
- Cyanotis pachyrrhiza Oberm. – Transvaal
- Cyanotis paludosa Brenan – Zaïre, Kenya, Uganda, Tanzania
- Cyanotis pedunculata Merr. – Leyte Island in Philippines
- Cyanotis pilosa Schult. & Schult.f. – southern India and Sri Lanka
- Cyanotis polyrrhiza Hochst. ex Hassk. – Ethiopia
- Cyanotis repens Faden & D.M.Cameron – Zaïre, Kenya, Rwanda, Tanzania, Gabon
- Cyanotis reutiana Beauverd – southern India
- Cyanotis robusta Oberm. – Transvaal, Namibia
- Cyanotis scaberula Hutch. – Guinea
- Cyanotis somaliensis C.B.Clarke – Somalia
- Cyanotis speciosa (L. f.) Hassk. – central + southern Africa and Madagascar
- Cyanotis thwaitesii Hassk. – India, Sri Lanka, Myanmar
- Cyanotis tuberosa (Roxb.) Schult. & Schult.f. – western India
- Cyanotis vaga (Lour.) Schult. & Schult.f. – tropical Africa, Yemen, Himalayas, southern China, Indochina, and Java
- Cyanotis villosa (Spreng.) Schult. & Schult.f. – southern India and Sri Lanka
- Cyanotis vivipara Dalzell – southern India

== Gallery ==
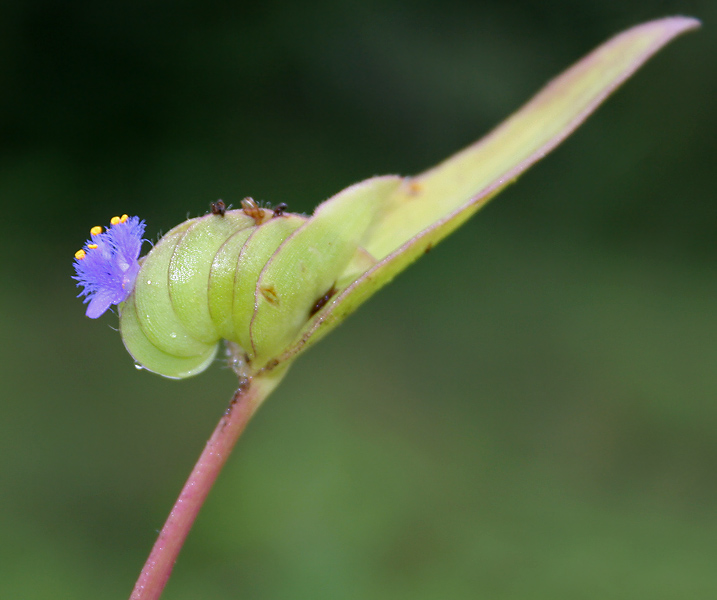
Cyanotis cristata in Hyderabad, India.

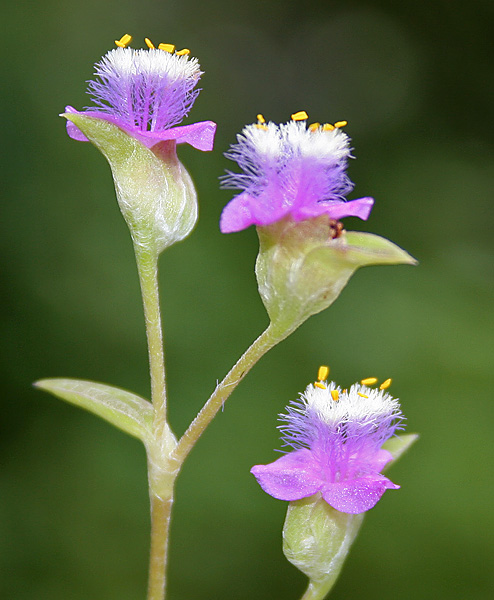
Cyanotis fasciculata in Hyderabad, India.
