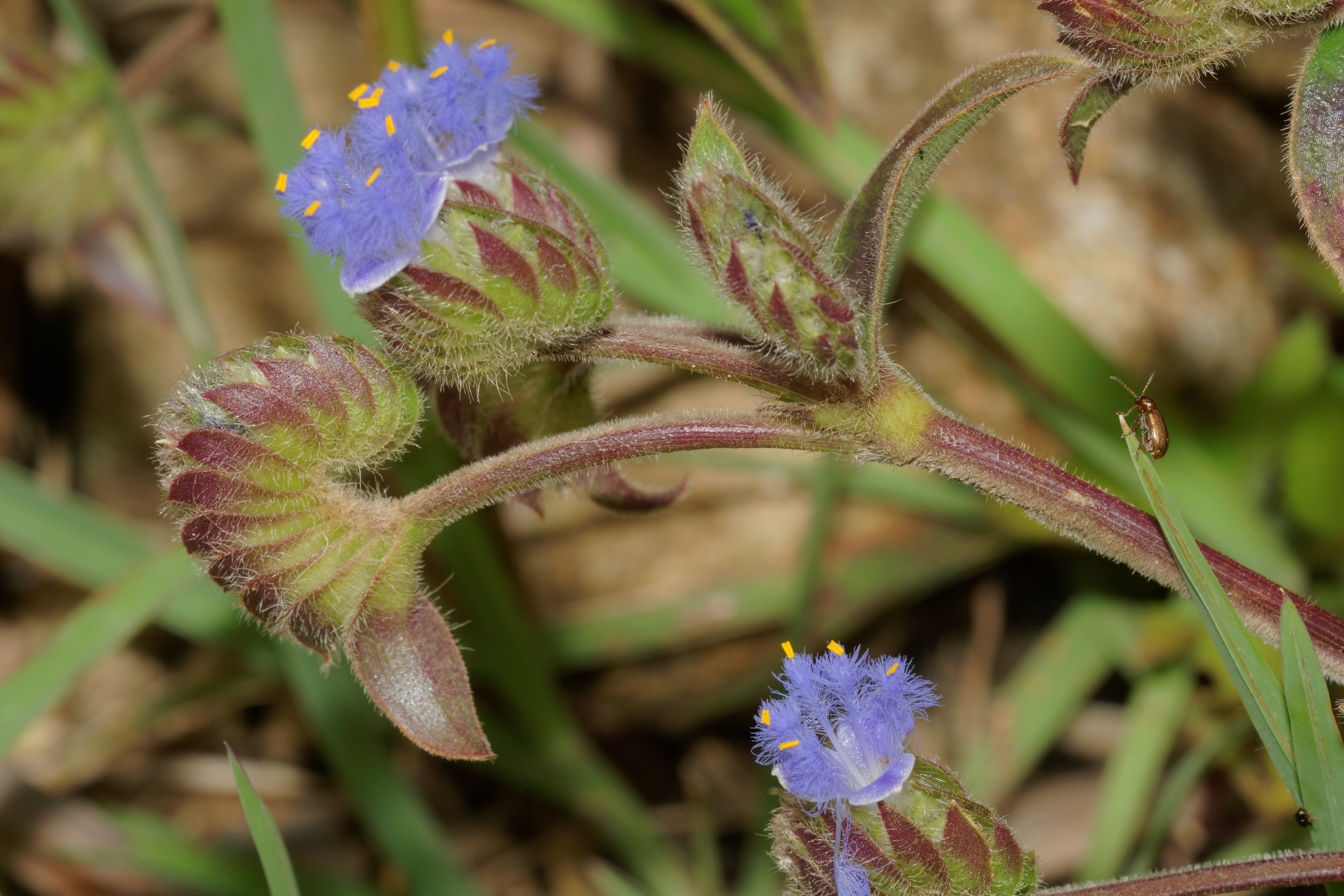

Scientific classification
- Kingdom: Plantae
- Clade: Tracheophytes
- Clade: Angiosperms
- Clade: Monocots
- Clade: Commelinids
- Order: Commelinales
- Family: Commelinaceae
- Genus: Cyanotis
- Species: C. tuberosa

Binomial name
- Cyanotis tuberosa (Roxb.) Schult. & Schult.f.

= Cyanotis tuberosa =

Species of flowering plant

Cyanotis tuberosa, is a species of plants in the Commelinaceae family.
