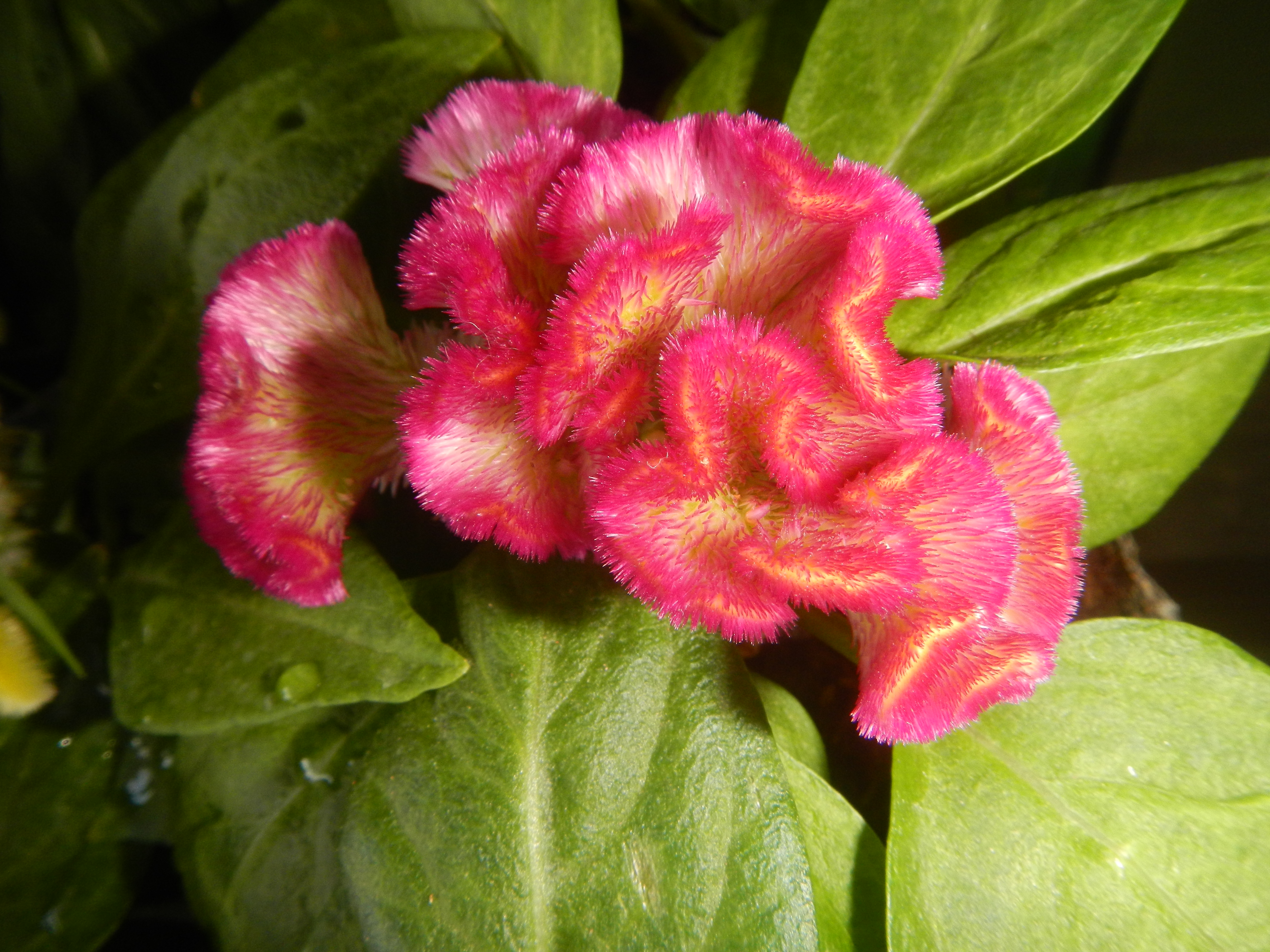

Scientific classification
- Kingdom: Plantae
- Clade: Tracheophytes
- Clade: Angiosperms
- Clade: Eudicots
- Order: Caryophyllales
- Family: Amaranthaceae
- Genus: Celosia
- Species: C. argentea
- Variety: C. a. var. cristata

Trinomial name
- Celosia argentea var. cristata (L.) Kuntze

Synonyms
- C. cristata L.; C. argentea f. cristata (L.) Schinz

= Celosia argentea var. cristata =

Cockscomb

Variety of flowering plant

Celosia argentea var. cristata (formerly Celosia cristata), known as cockscomb, is the cristate or crested variety of the species Celosia argentea. It is likely native to India, where it was saved from extinction through cultivation because of its religious significance. Indian, Burmese, and Chinese gardeners have traditionally planted it near temples. The name cockscomb comes from the flower's appearance, which resembles the crest (comb) on a rooster (cock). The plants are resistant to most plant diseases, and can thrive both indoors and outdoors. However, they do best in sunny, well-drained locations, as the plant is susceptible to fungal diseases.

Primarily cultivated as an ornamental plant, cockscomb is valued for its distinctive wavy, velvety inflorescence. The plant is often displayed indoors as decoration, and the flowers can be cut and dried for use in dry bouquets. The leaves and flowers are edible. They are often grown as food in India, Western Africa, and South America.

The somatic chromosome number for the cristate variety is 2n = 36, while investigation of the typical species revealed a chromosome number of 2n = 72.

== Description ==
Cockscombs are tropical annual plants. As an herbaceous plant, they lack woody stems, instead having a straight, unbranched stem. The elliptic leaves lanceolate, and can range in color from green to reddish-bronze with terminal inflorescences. The plant produces thick, flattened, velvety flower heads, which can also range in color. They grow well in both humid and arid conditions, and their flowers can last for up to 8 weeks. Each flower is capable of producing a high number of seeds, up to 1,500 per gram or 43,000 per ounce.

The plants range in height, but can grow up to 30 cm (1 ft). Depending on the cultivar, the leaves may be green or reddish-bronze. The flower can be divided into three components: spikes, plumes, and crests, which can vary from one another but share common characteristics. The flowers are typically brightly colored, most often in shades of red, yellow, pink, or orange, though other colors can be found. In some hybrids, multiple colors may appear on a single plant.

== Cultivation ==
Cockscomb is easily cultivated from seeds. Despite its tropical origins, it can also be successfully grown during warmer months in colder climates. As an annual plant, it completes its life cycle in three to four months. A soil temperature of 60 °F (16 °C) is optimal for growth. Cockscomb prefers well-draining soils rich in organic matter and full sun or partial shade. Seeds can be sown indoors in early to mid-spring, with seedlings transplanted outdoors in early summer. Regular, generous watering is during the warm months is essential, and the plants will continue blooming until frost.

Cockscomb is relatively easy to grow and care for. The plant has few insect pests, though some mites are occasionally known to feed on it. The plants are susceptible to leaf spot and root rot, which can be managed with proper watering practices. Wetting the leaf and flowers should be avoided to prevent fungal diseases.

Cultivars include 'Jewel box', 'Century mix', 'New Look', and 'Pink Castle'. The variety of shapes and colors of flowers and leaves make the cultivars of Celosia argentea popular ornamental plants globally.

== Range ==
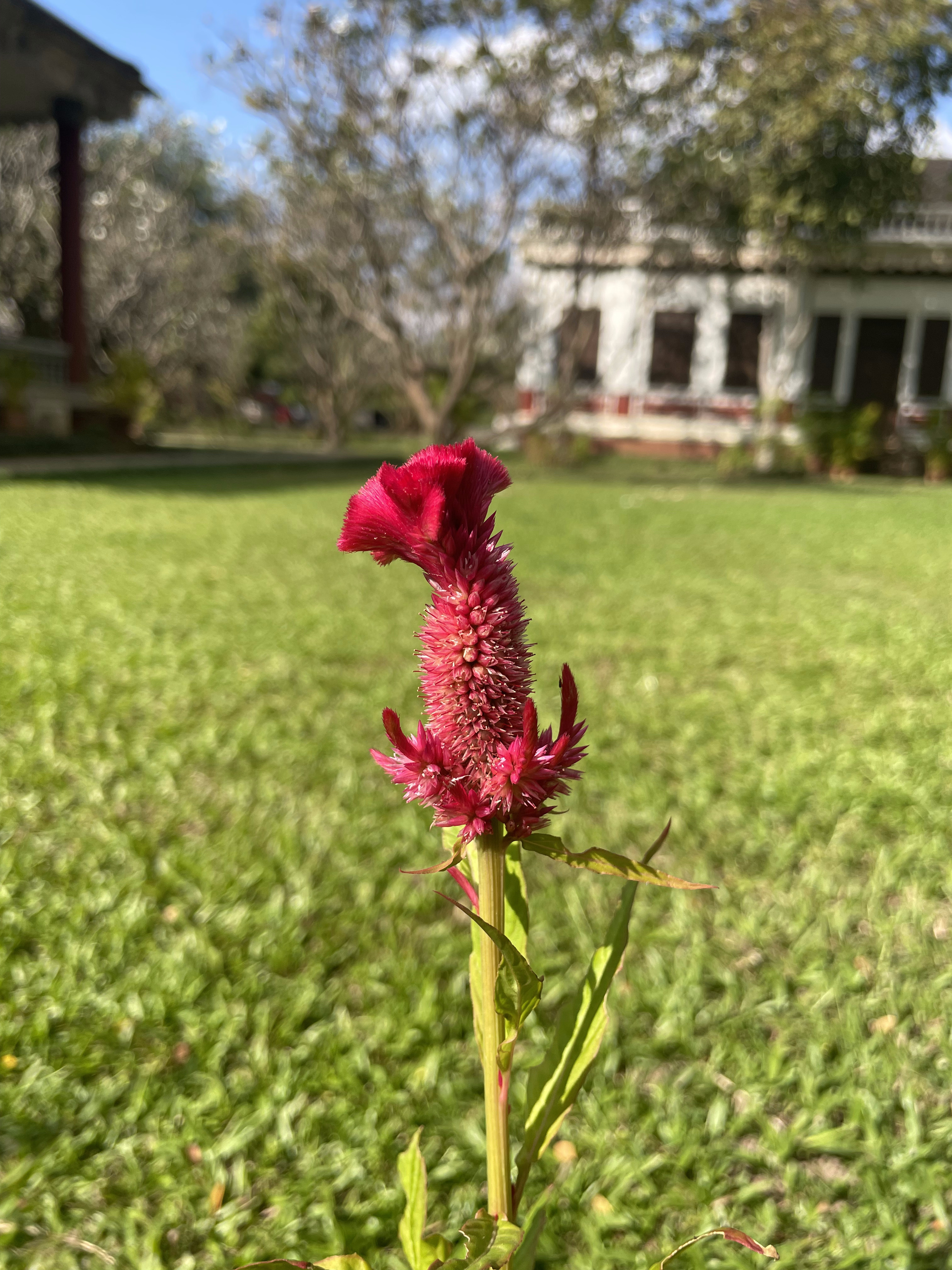
Celosia argentea var. cristata native to Cambodia.

The octoploid form of Celosia argentea var. cristana is found worldwide in tropics and subtropics. The tetraploid form occurs only in central and southern India. Information about the cultivated cristata and plumosa varieties come primarily from cultural records from India, Burma and China, where they have been traditionally planted near religious sites and gardens. These cultivated varieties do not appear to occur naturally in the wild, likely because the plants produce relatively few seeds. The provenance of these cultivated forms is unclear, despite several investigations.

== Uses ==
Similar to amaranth, the cockscomb can be used as a vegetable. It is most widely consumed in southern Nigeria, Benin, Congo and Indonesia. The plants are typically grown in home gardens and small farms, both for household and commercial use. Young stems and flowers are also edible. Additionally, the seeds are edible and classified as pseudocereals. Due to its resistance to pests and disease and its high crop yield, cockscomb appears to be a good alternative to amaranth.

One study has shown that the silver fire-pot variety can help control the growth of weeds in fields. In particular, when sown alongside cereal or sorghum crops, cockscomb can help reduce infestations of African witchweeds (Striga), a group of parasitic plants. In the study, the yield was increased significantly when cockscomb was planted together with other crops. Cockscomb appears to release a compound that triggers "suicidal germination" in Striga seeds, causing them to germinate in the absence of a suitable host. This compound appeared to operate several meters from the plant, reducing Striga germination by as much as 68% compared to cotton, which was used as a control in the study.

In Korea, cockscomb flowers are sometimes used as a traditional garnish for desserts, rice cakes and flower-infused alcoholic beverages.

== Chemical composition ==
Cockscomb contains a variety of chemical compounds, including water, vitamin C, carotenoids, protein, nitrate, and oxalate. In addition, triterpene saponins, soap-like natural compounds, have been detected in the roots and seeds of the silver fire variant. The roots contain sugars, while the leaves and stems are rich in flavonoids, a group of plant compounds with antioxidant properties. Consumption of the seeds has shown a diuretic effect.

Yellow inflorescences of var. cristata and plumosa may contain high doses of dopamine. Celosian, a polysaccharide contained in the seeds of the cockscomb tuft, has demonstrated liver-protective and immune-stimulating effects. Aqueous extracts from the seeds have also shown potential anti-metastatic effects in the livers of mice.

== Gallery ==
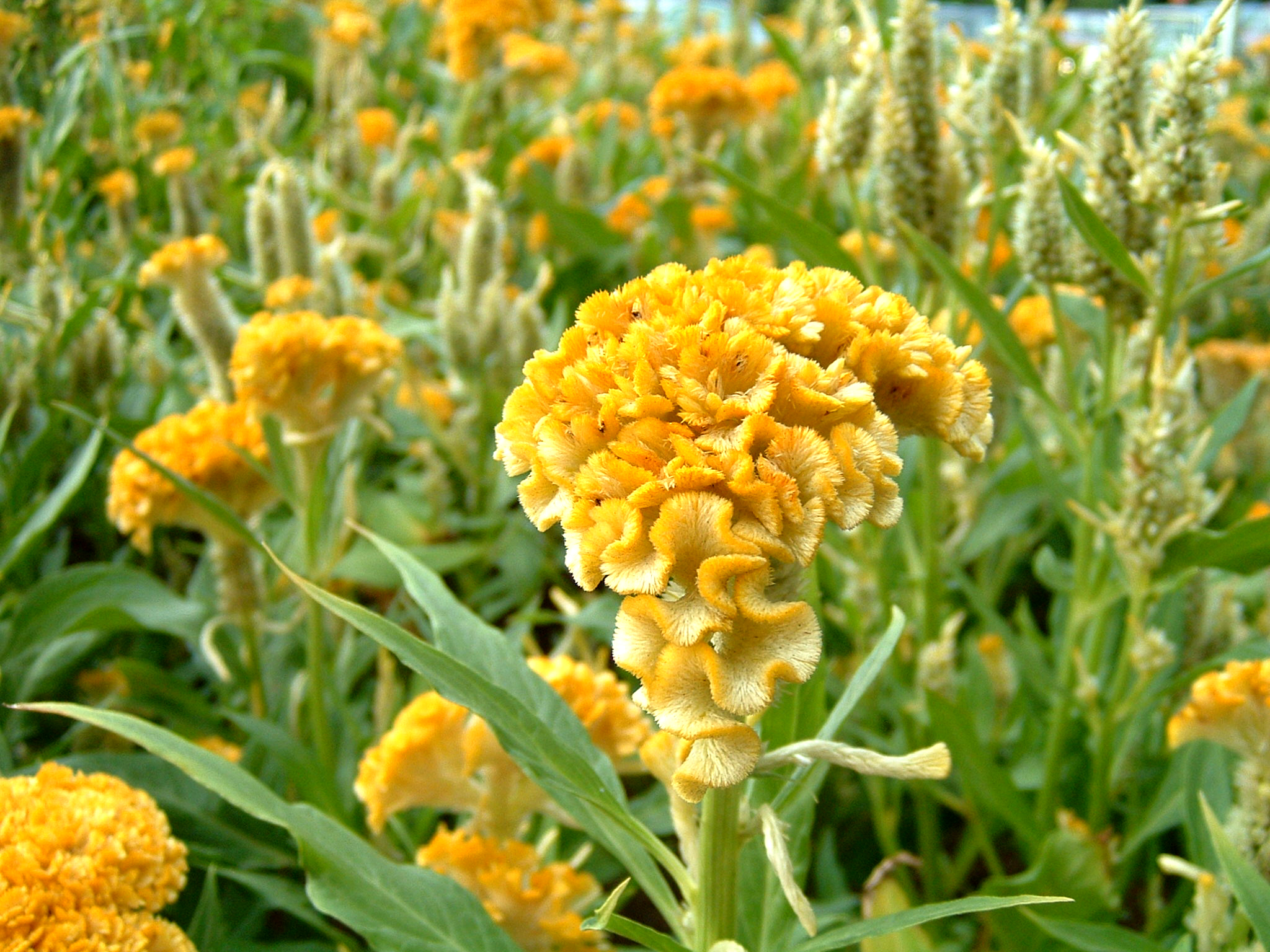
Yellow Celosia argentea var. cristata

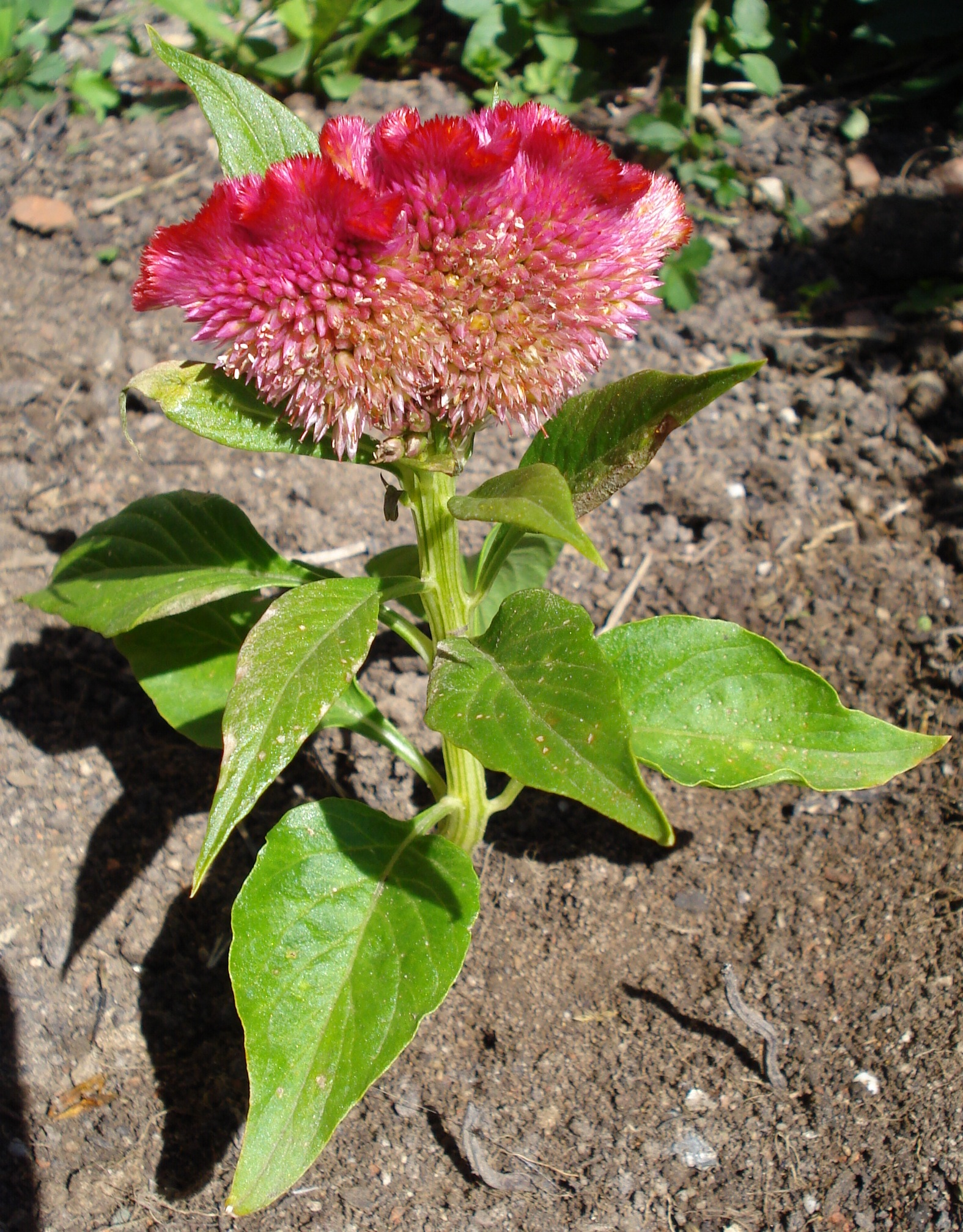
Pink Celosia argentea var. cristata

== See also ==
- Celosia argentea
