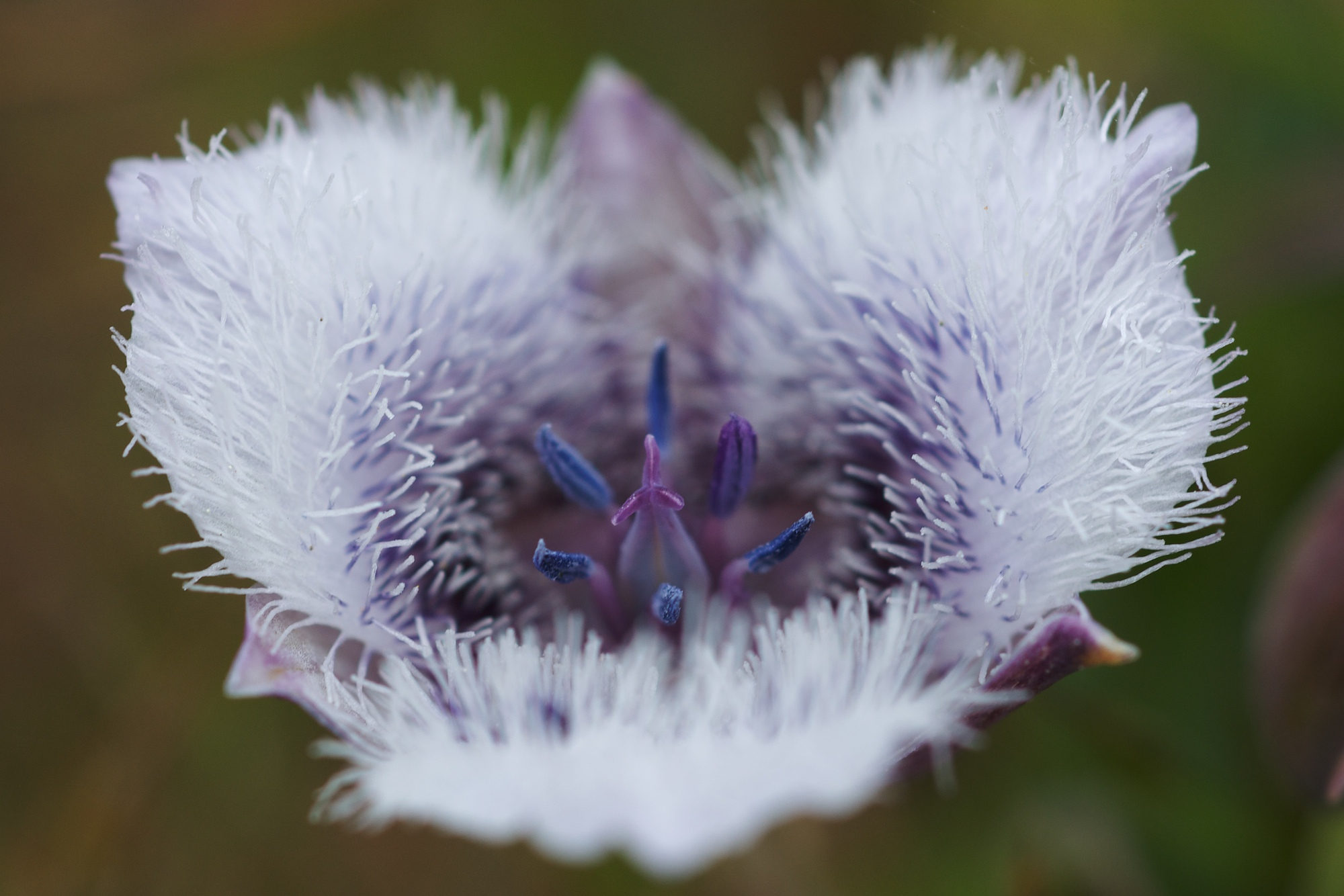

Scientific classification
- Kingdom: Plantae
- Clade: Tracheophytes
- Clade: Angiosperms
- Clade: Monocots
- Order: Liliales
- Family: Liliaceae
- Genus: Calochortus
- Species: C. tolmiei

Binomial name
- Calochortus tolmiei Hook. & Arn.

Synonyms
- Calochortus elegans var. lobbii Baker; Calochortus elegans Baker 1875, illegitimate homonym not Pursh 1813; Calochortus glaucus Regel; Calochortus purdyi Eastw.; Calochortus maweanus var. major Purdy; Calochortus maweanus var. roseus Purdy; Calochortus galei Peck

= Calochortus tolmiei =

Species of flowering plant

Calochortus tolmiei is a North American species of flowering plant in the lily family known by the common names Tolmie's star-tulip and pussy ears. It was discovered by and named for Dr. William Fraser Tolmie.

It is native to the west coast of the United States: Washington, Oregon, and northern California as far south as Santa Cruz County. It is a common member of the flora in several types of habitat.

== Description ==
Calochortus tolmiei is a perennial herb producing a slender stem, branched or unbranched, to 40 centimeters in maximum height. There is a basal leaf up to 40 centimeters long which does not wither at flowering, and generally a smaller leaf higher up the stem.

The inflorescence is a solitary bloom or a cluster of bell-shaped flowers. Each has white to pale pink or purple petals, that are up to 2.5 centimeters long, and three narrower sepals beneath. The petals are usually very hairy on their inner surfaces, and may be fringed with long hairs as well.

The fruit is a winged capsule 2 or 3 centimeters long containing several dark brown seeds.
