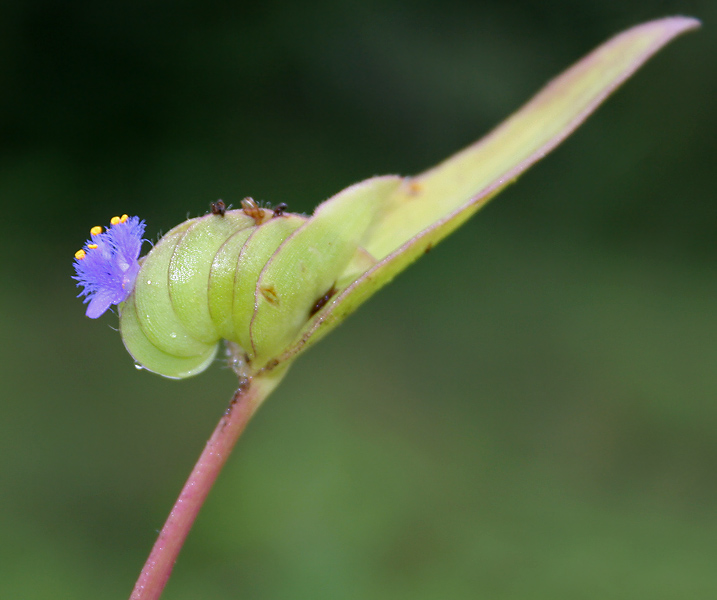
- In Hyderabad

Scientific classification
- Kingdom: Plantae
- Clade: Tracheophytes
- Clade: Angiosperms
- Clade: Monocots
- Clade: Commelinids
- Order: Commelinales
- Family: Commelinaceae
- Genus: Cyanotis
- Species: C. cristata

Binomial name
- Cyanotis cristata (L.) D.Don

Synonyms
- List: Commelina cristata L.; Tradescantia cristata (L.) L.; Ephemerum cristatum (L.) Moench; Siphostigma cristata (L.) Raf.; Tonningia cristata (L.) Kuntze; Zygomenes cristata (L.) W.Wight; Tradescantia imbricata Roxb.; Cyanotis imbricata (Roxb.) Kunth; Cyanotis huegelii Hassk.; Cyanotis racemosa C.B.Clarke; Tradescantia umbellata B.Heyne ex C.B.Clarke; Cyanotis cavaleriei H.Lév. & Vaniot

= Cyanotis cristata =

Species of flowering plant

Cyanotis cristata is a species of perennial plant in the family Commelinaceae. It is native to the Indian subcontinent, southern China, Southeast Asia, Ethiopia, Socotra, Mauritius, Java, and the Philippines.

Cyanotis cristata is a creeping herb found in sandy or grassy spots. It is common in eastern hills of Nepal.
