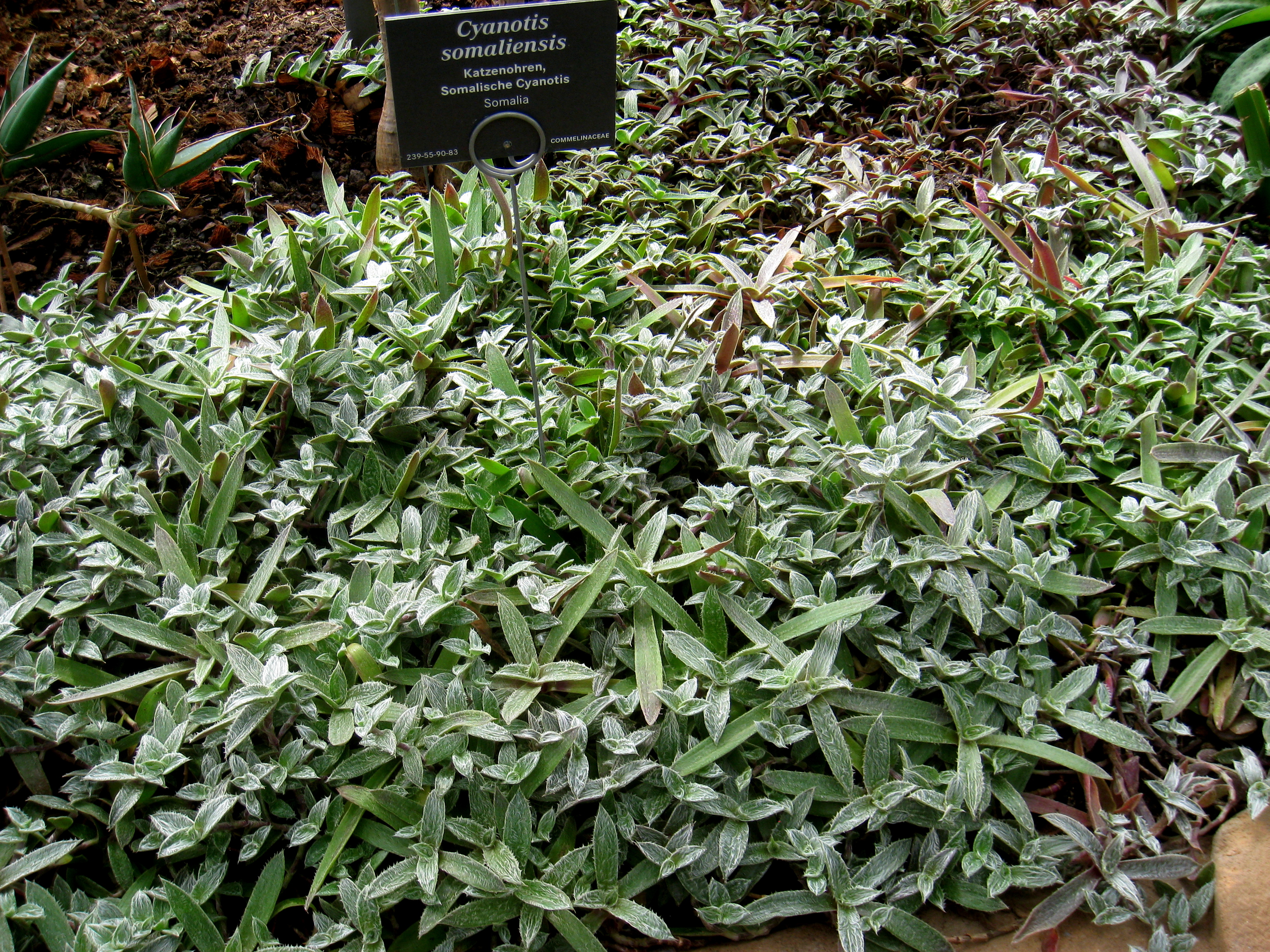

Scientific classification
- Kingdom: Plantae
- Clade: Embryophytes
- Clade: Tracheophytes
- Clade: Angiosperms
- Clade: Monocots
- Clade: Commelinids
- Order: Commelinales
- Family: Commelinaceae
- Genus: Cyanotis
- Species: C. somaliensis

Binomial name
- Cyanotis somaliensis C.B.Clarke

= Cyanotis somaliensis =

Species of flowering plant

Cyanotis somaliensis, pussy ears, is a species of flowering plant in the family Commelinaceae, described in 1895. It is endemic to Somalia in East Africa. Growing to 12 cm (4.7 in) tall by 50 cm (20 in) broad, it is an evergreen perennial with hairy, slightly succulent leaves and, in summer, three-lobed blue or purple flowers which resemble those of Tradescantia, a closely related genus.

This plant is valued for its ornamental properties. In temperate regions it must be grown under glass, as it does not tolerate temperatures below 10 °C (50 °F). It has gained the Royal Horticultural Society's Award of Garden Merit. It prefers rather dry conditions in bright light.
