= Botanical Garden of Curitiba =

Botanical garden

- Jardim Botânico de Curitiba
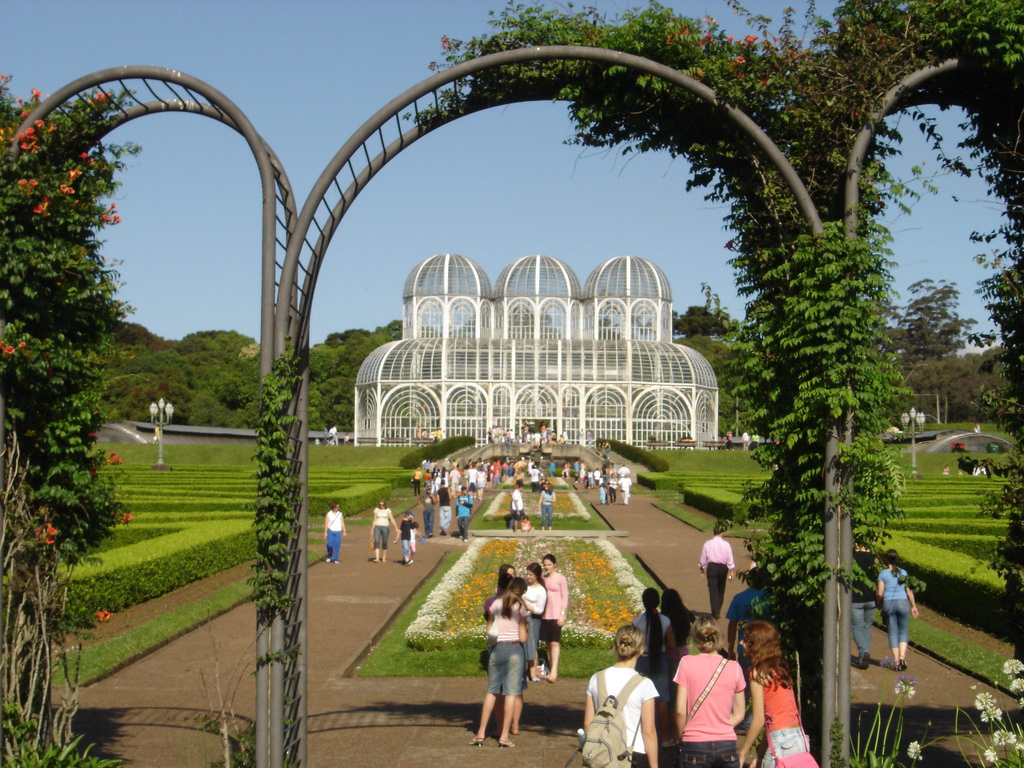
- Interactive map of Botanical Garden of Curitiba
- Location: Curitiba, Parana, Brazil
- Coordinates: 25°26′34″S 49°14′22″W
- Area: 278,000 square metres (2,990,000 ft^{2})

The Jardim Botânico de Curitiba, also known in English as the Botanical Garden of Curitiba and formally referred to as Jardim Botânico Fanchette Rischbieter, is a prominent park situated in Curitiba, the capital of the state of Paraná in southern Brazil. It is a key tourist attraction and landmark within the city and houses a portion of the Federal University of Paraná campus. The international identification code for the garden is CURIT.

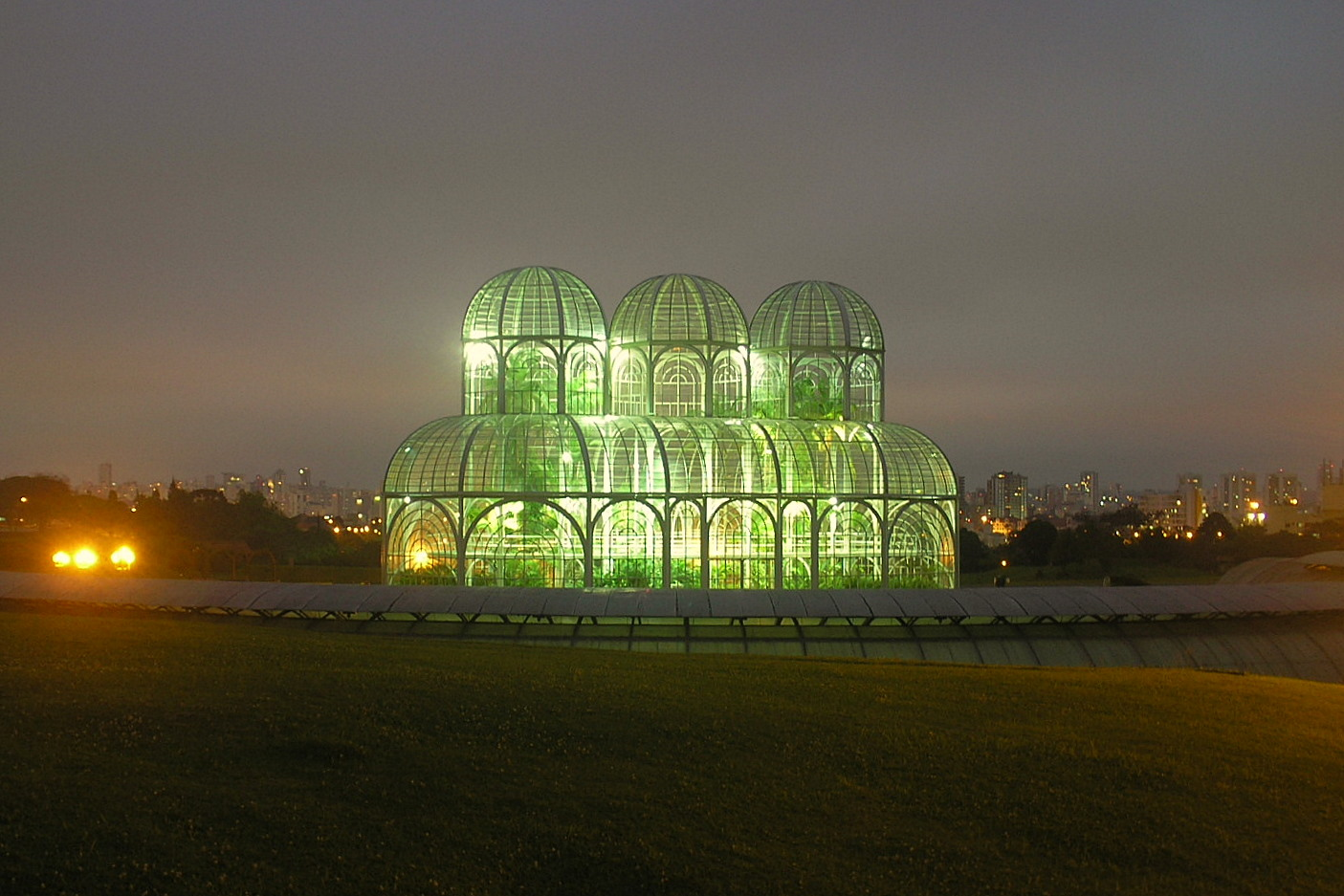
Skyline of Curitiba by Botanical Garden at night.

The garden during the build-up to the 2014 FIFA World Cup.

Established in 1991, the Jardim Botânico de Curitiba was designed in the style of French formal gardens. Upon entering the park, visitors are greeted by expansive gardens featuring fountains, waterfalls, and lakes, as well as the principal greenhouse, which spans 458 square meters. The greenhouse, constructed in an Art Nouveau style with a modern metallic framework, resembles the mid-19th century Crystal Palace in London and showcases tropical plant species. The park covers an area of 240,000 m^{2}.

The Botanic Museum, located within the park, houses a national reference collection of native flora and attracts researchers from around the globe. It includes a diverse array of botanical species from the Atlantic Forests of eastern Brazil.

Adjacent to the greenhouse is the Museum of Franz Krajcberg, dedicated to the Polish-Brazilian artist renowned for his environmental advocacy. This museum, covering 1,320 m^{2}, features multimedia classrooms, a 60-seat auditorium, and exhibition spaces showcasing works donated by visual artists, including sculptures, reliefs, photographs, videos, and educational materials.

On the opposite side of the park stands the Botanical Museum, a wooden structure accessible via a wooden bridge. The Botanical Museum of Curitiba is home to the fourth-largest herbarium in Brazil. The area surrounding the museum includes a pond with various aquatic life, a lake, an auditorium, a library, exhibition spaces, a theater, tennis courts, and a cycle track.

== Gallery ==
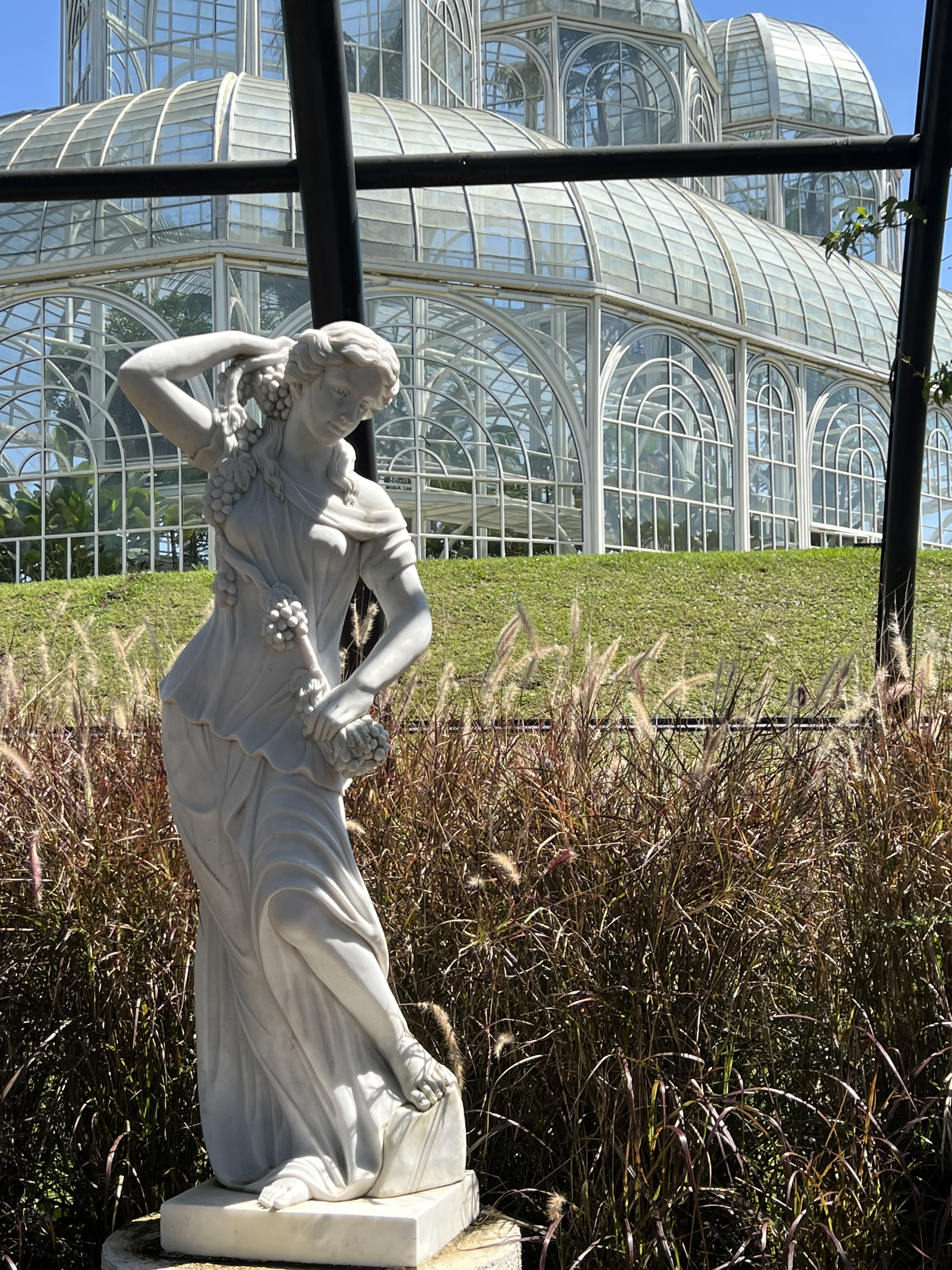
Greek statue of a woman holding grapes overlooking the main greenhouse from the Frans Krajcberg Gallery.

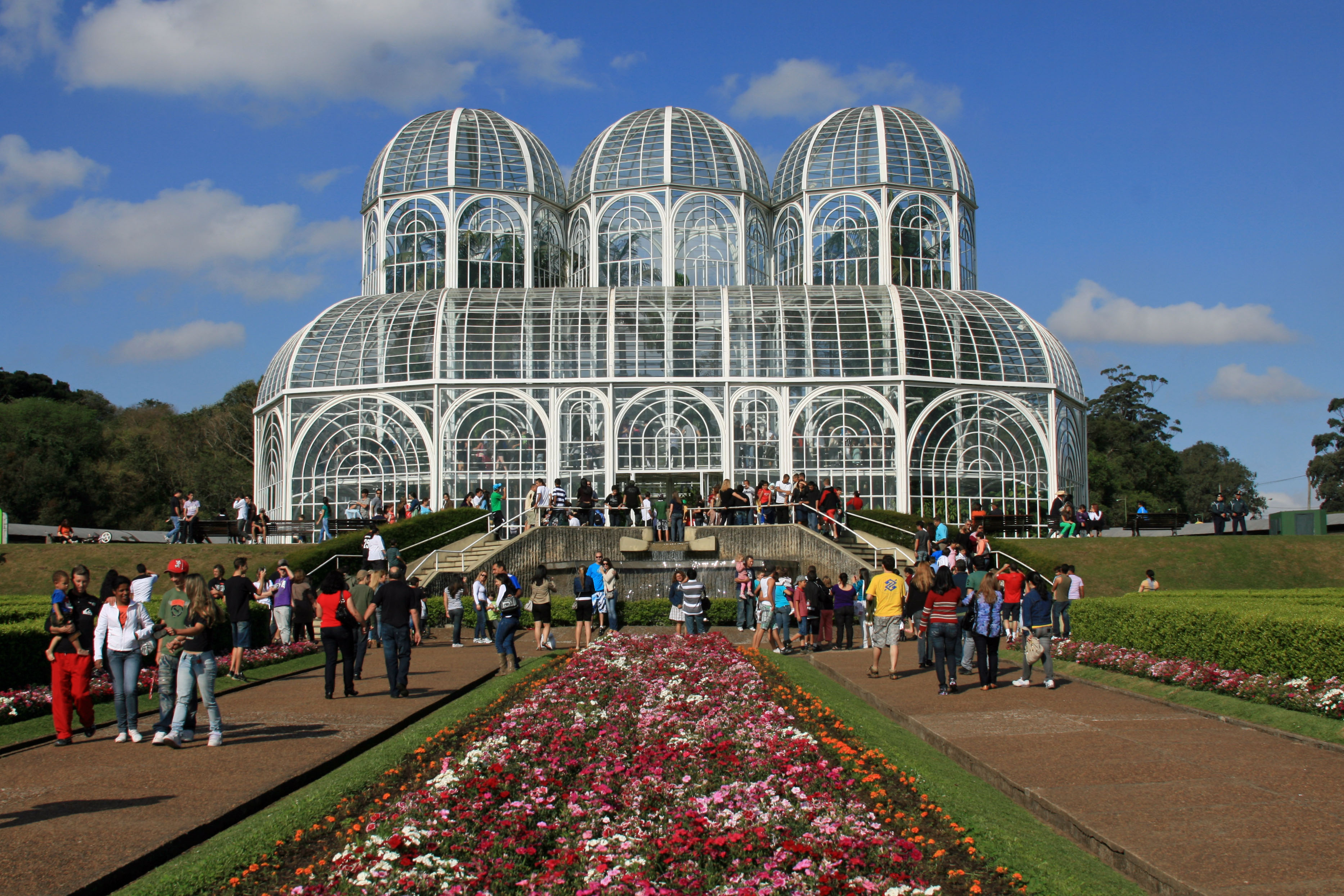
The garden

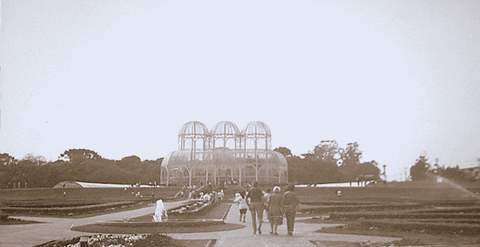
In the inaugural year

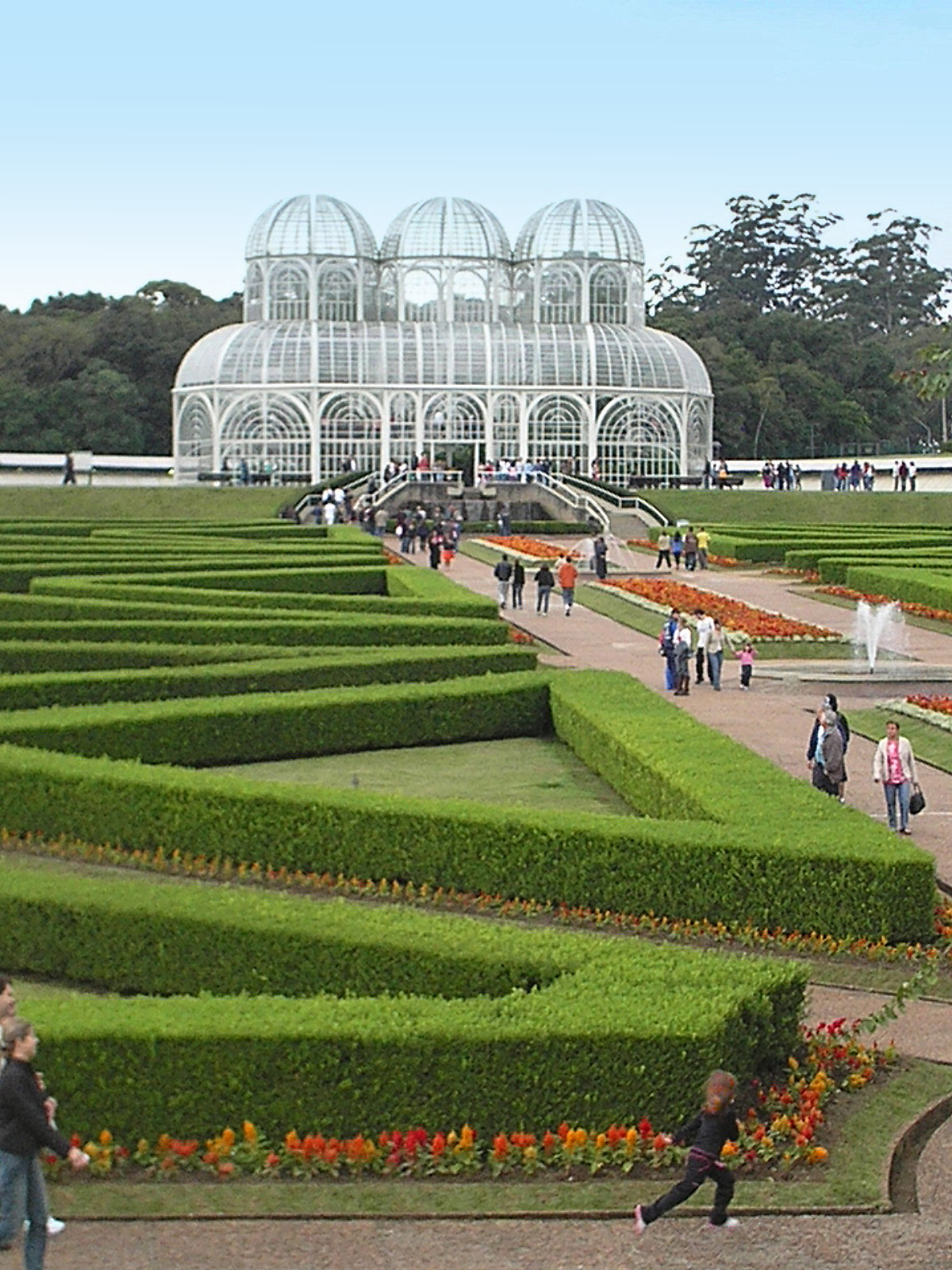
The French gardens

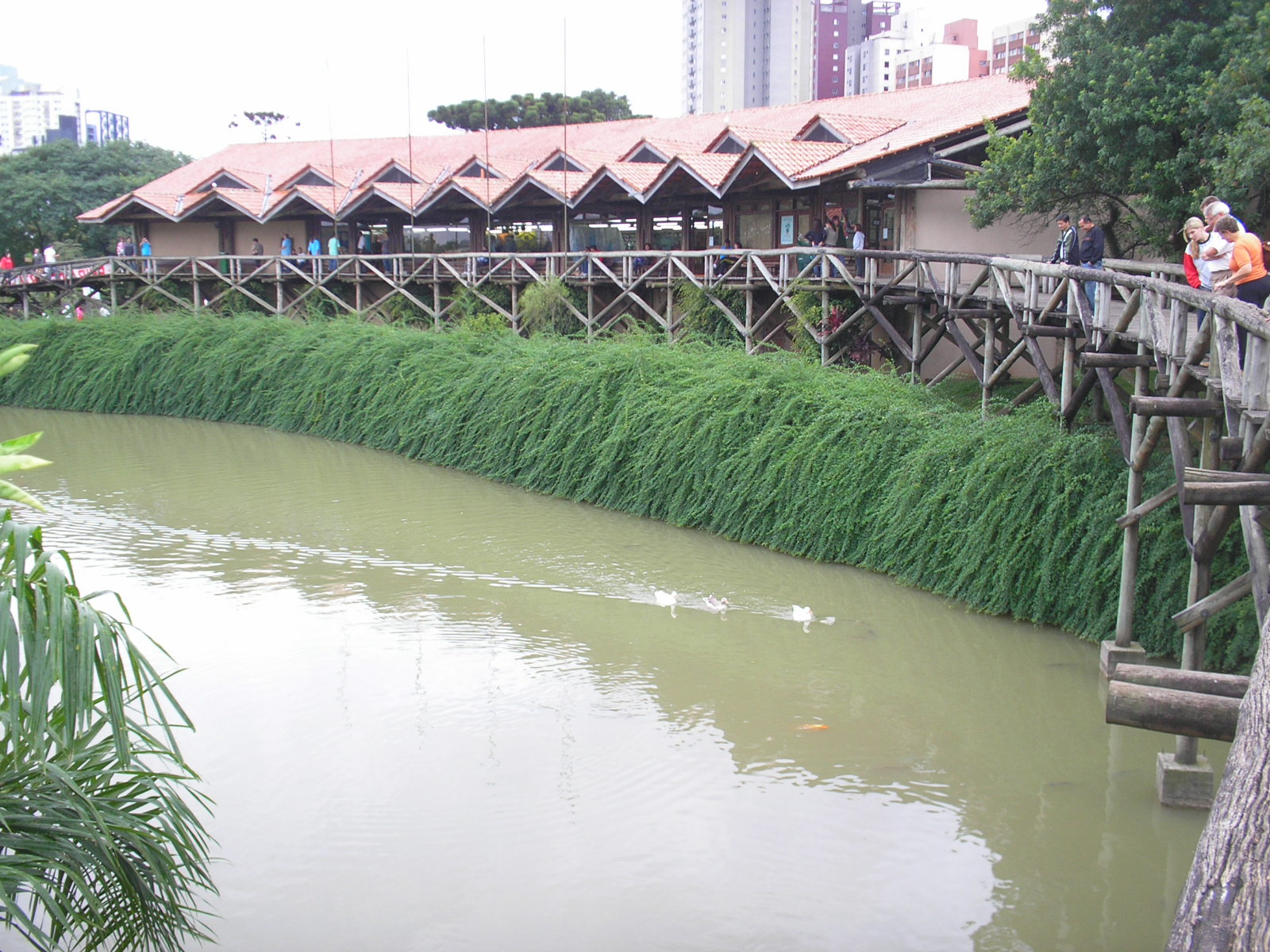
Botanic Museum

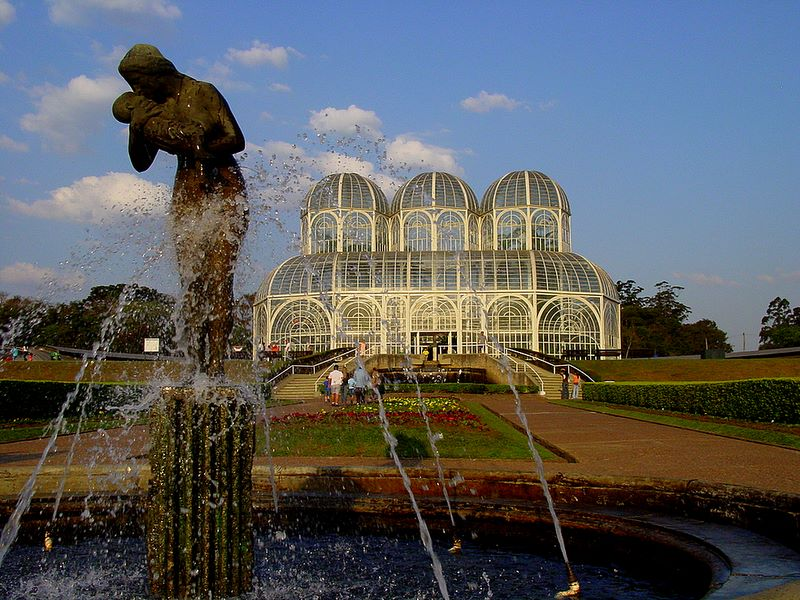
"A Mãe" ("The Mother") sculpture

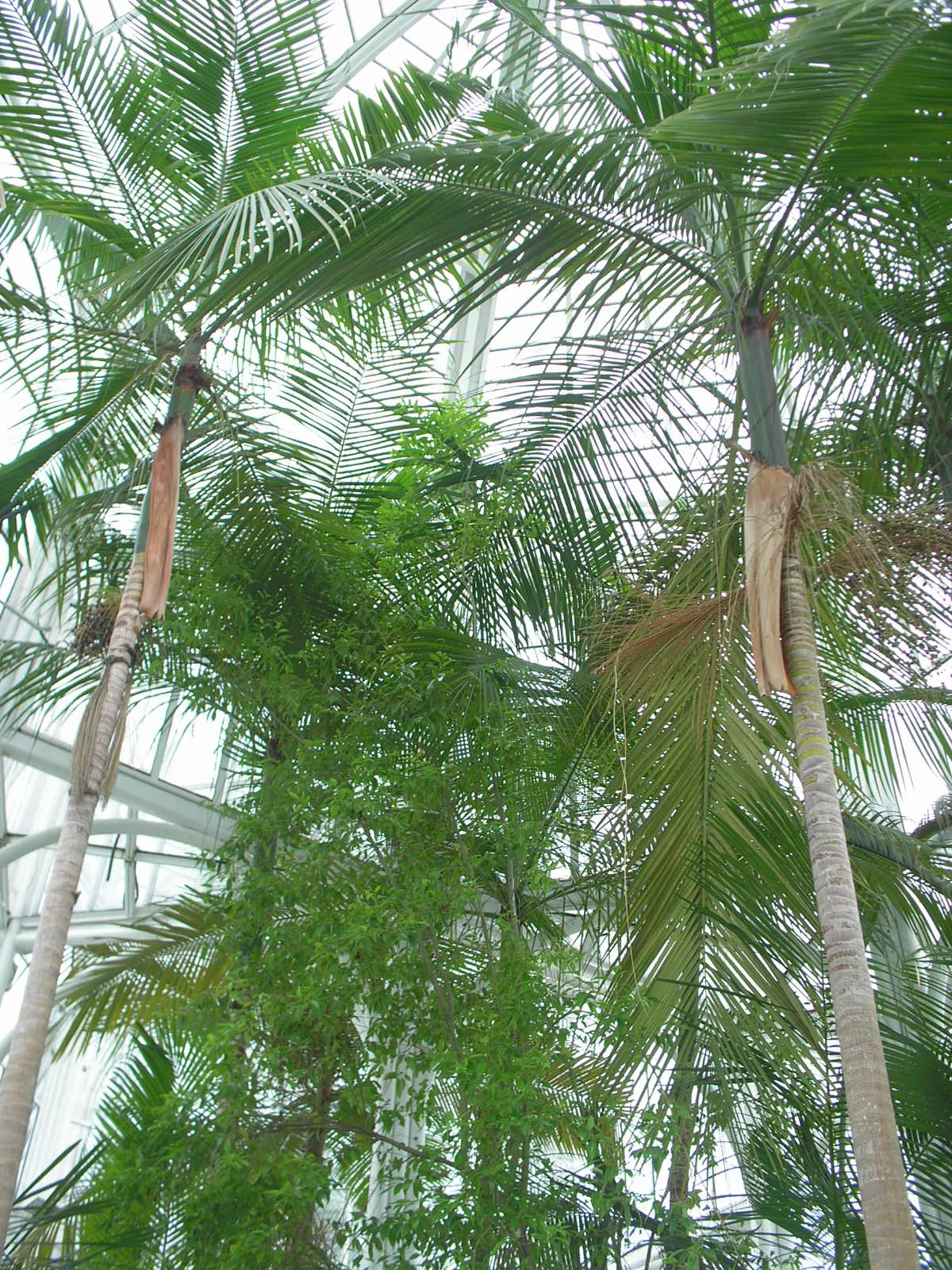
Plants inside the greenhouse

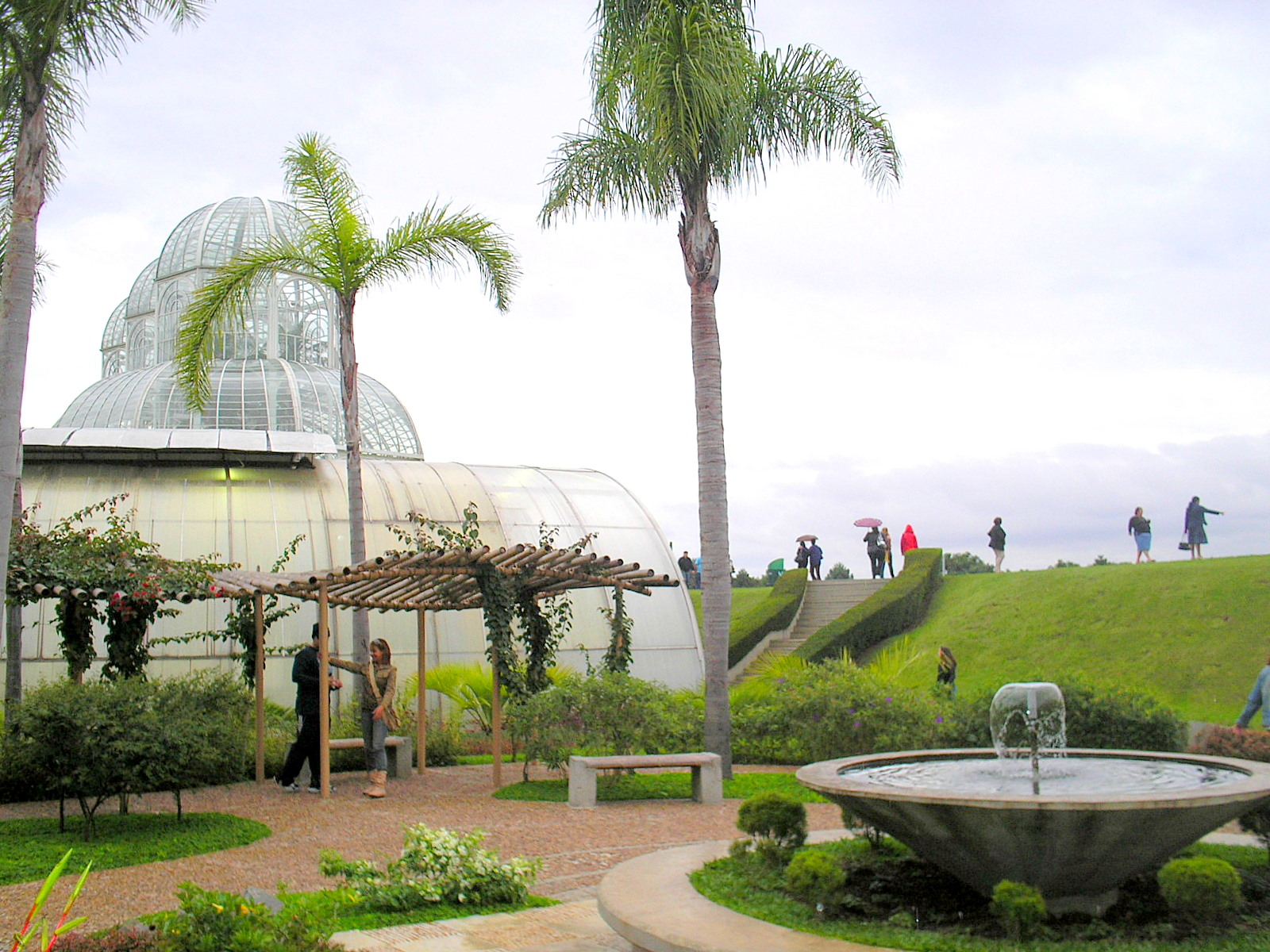
Garden with native flowers

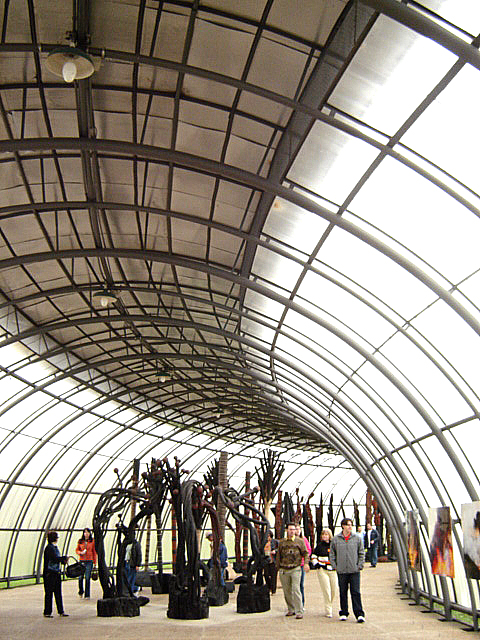
Inside the Frans Krajcberg Gallery

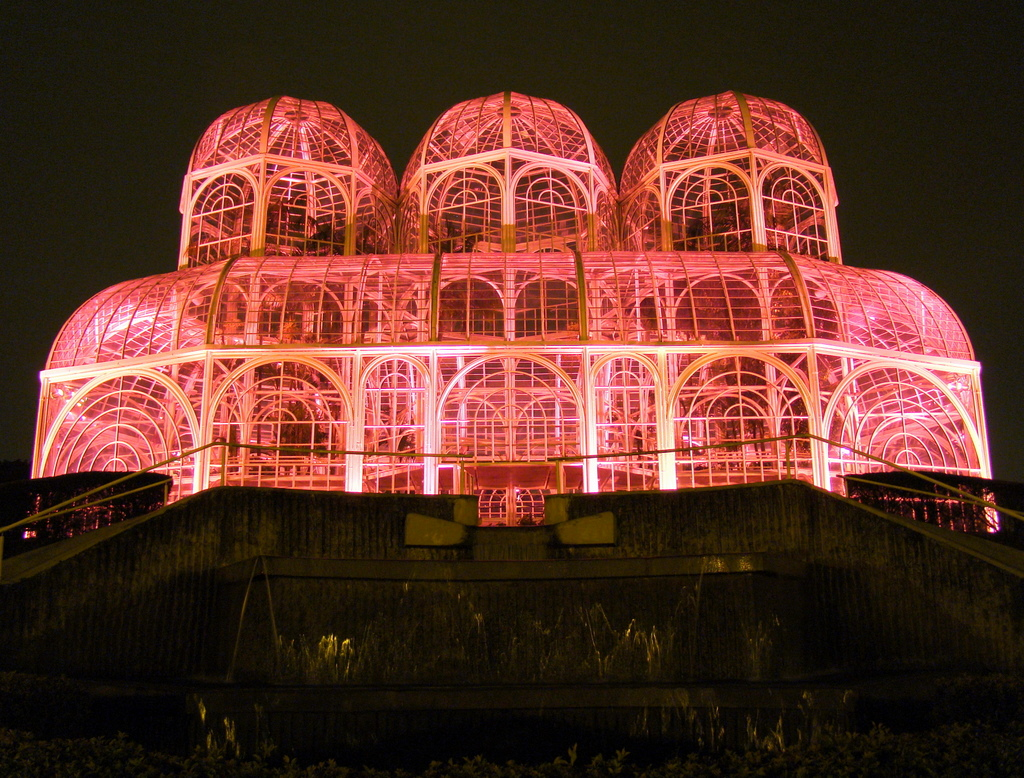
On Breast Cancer Day
