= C. poeppigii =

C. poeppigii may refer to:

- Campylocentrum poeppigii, a rare orchid
- Canna poeppigii, a garden plant
- Carex poeppigii, a true sedge
- Citharexylum poeppigii, a flowering plant
- Cyathea poeppigii, a tree fern
- Cyathus poeppigii, a bird's nest fungus
- Cyperus poeppigii, a papyrus sedge
