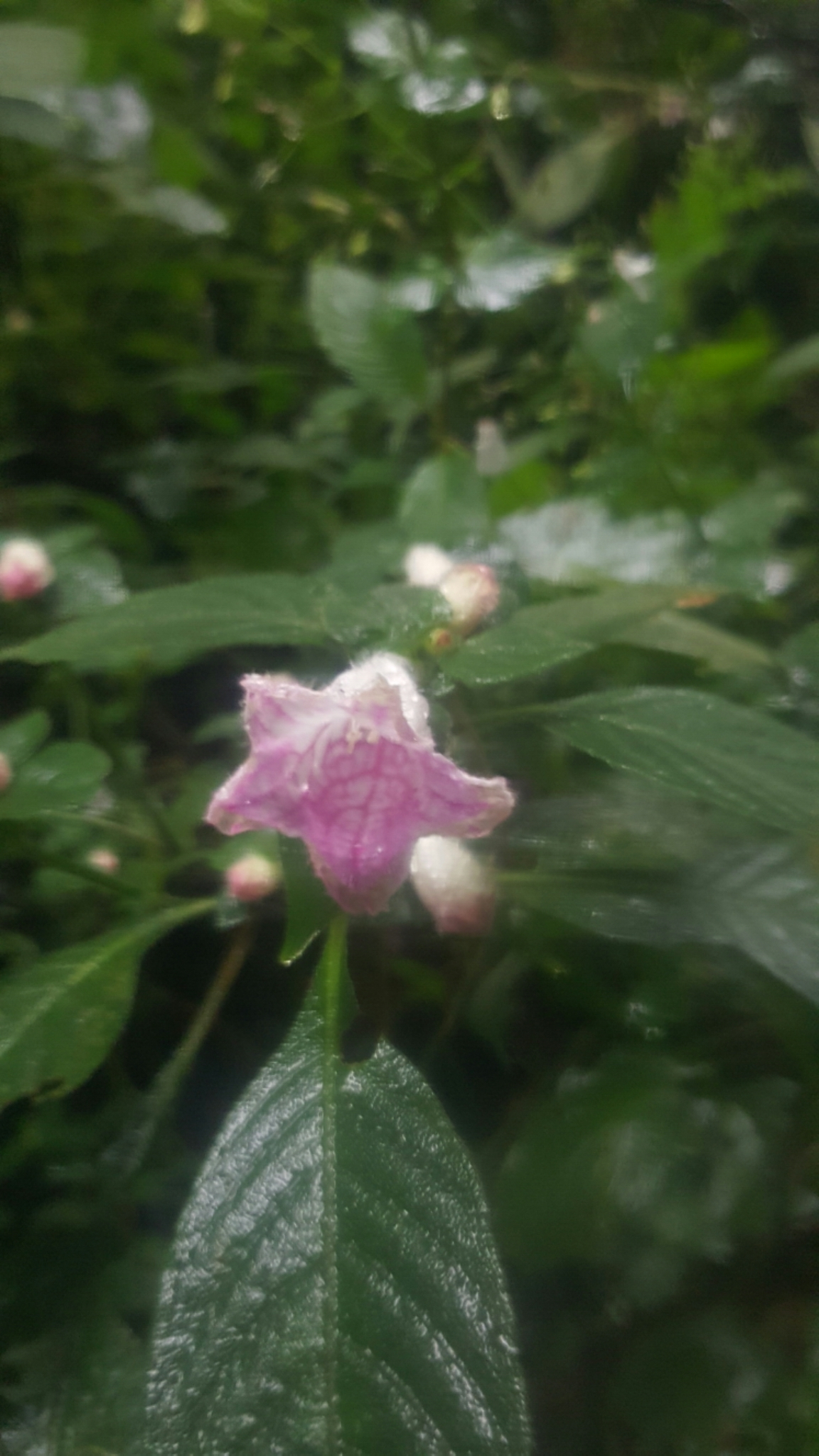

Scientific classification
- Kingdom: Plantae
- Clade: Embryophytes
- Clade: Tracheophytes
- Clade: Angiosperms
- Clade: Eudicots
- Clade: Asterids
- Order: Lamiales
- Family: Acanthaceae
- Subfamily: Acanthoideae
- Tribe: Ruellieae
- Genus: Acanthopale; C.B.Clarke (1899)

Species
- 12; see text

= Acanthopale =

Genus of flowering plants

Acanthopale is a plant genus of shrubs or subshrubs in the Acanthaceae plant family. The genus name is based on the classic Greek words for thorn ákantha and stake palum. Some species in the genus are cultivated as ornamental plants.

== Species ==
12 species are accepted:

- Acanthopale aethiogermanica Ensermu
- Acanthopale breviceps (Benoist) Callm. & Phillipson
- Acanthopale cuneifolia (Benoist) Callm. & Phillipson
- Acanthopale confertiflora (Lindau) C.B.Clarke
- Acanthopale decempedalis C.B.Clarke (synonym A. cameronica Bremek.)
- Acanthopale humblotii (Benoist) Callm. & Phillipson
- Acanthopale laxiflora (Lindau) C.B.Clarke (syn. Dischistocalyx laxiflorus Lindau)
- Acanthopale macrocarpa Vollesen
- Acanthopale madagascariensis (Baker) C.B.Clarke ex Bremek.
- Acanthopale perrieri (Benoist) Callm. & Phillipson
- Acanthopale pubescens (Lindau) C.B.Clarke
- Acanthopale ramiflora (Benoist) Callm. & Phillipson

=== Formerly placed here ===
Dischistocalyx grandifolius C.B.Clarke (as Acanthopale buchholzii (Lindau) C.B.Clarke)
