= Cyperus disjunctus =

Scientific classification
- Kingdom: Plantae
- Clade: Tracheophytes
- Clade: Angiosperms
- Clade: Monocots
- Clade: Commelinids
- Order: Poales
- Family: Cyperaceae
- Genus: Cyperus
- Species: C. disjunctus

Binomial name
- Cyperus disjunctus C.B.Clarke

Species of plant endemic to Australia

Cyperus disjunctus is a species of sedge that is endemic to parts of north eastern Australia.

The species was first formally described by the botanist Charles Baron Clarke in 1908.

== See also ==
- List of Cyperus species
