= Carex enneastachya =

Conservation status
- Endangered (IUCN 3.1)

Scientific classification
- Kingdom: Plantae
- Clade: Tracheophytes
- Clade: Angiosperms
- Clade: Monocots
- Clade: Commelinids
- Order: Poales
- Family: Cyperaceae
- Genus: Carex
- Species: C. enneastachya

Binomial name
- Carex enneastachya C.B.Clarke, 1908

Synonyms
- Carex azuayae Steyerm.

Species of plant in the sedge family

Carex enneastachya is a species of tussock-forming perennial in the family Cyperaceae. It is native to north-eastern parts of South America, where it is considered an endangered species.

== See also ==
- List of Carex species
