= Cyperus inops =

Scientific classification
- Kingdom: Plantae
- Clade: Tracheophytes
- Clade: Angiosperms
- Clade: Monocots
- Clade: Commelinids
- Order: Poales
- Family: Cyperaceae
- Genus: Cyperus
- Species: C. inops

Binomial name
- Cyperus inops C.B.Clarke

Species of plant native to Brazil

Cyperus inops is a species of sedge that is native to southern parts of Brazil.

The species was first formally described by the botanist Charles Baron Clarke in 1908.

== See also ==
- List of Cyperus species
