= Carex distracta =

Scientific classification
- Kingdom: Plantae
- Clade: Tracheophytes
- Clade: Angiosperms
- Clade: Monocots
- Clade: Commelinids
- Order: Poales
- Family: Cyperaceae
- Genus: Carex
- Species: C. distracta

Binomial name
- Carex distracta C.B.Clarke

Species of sedge

Carex distracta is a tussock-forming species of perennial sedge in the family Cyperaceae. It is native to Assam in India.

The species was first described by the botanist Charles Baron Clarke in 1894 as a part of the Joseph Dalton Hooker work The Flora of British India.

== See also ==
- List of Carex species
