= Carex cercidascus =

Scientific classification
- Kingdom: Plantae
- Clade: Tracheophytes
- Clade: Angiosperms
- Clade: Monocots
- Clade: Commelinids
- Order: Poales
- Family: Cyperaceae
- Genus: Carex
- Species: C. cercidascus

Binomial name
- Carex cercidascus C.B.Clarke

Species of sedge

Carex cercidascus is a tussock-forming perennial sedge in the family Cyperaceae. It is native to eastern parts of southeastern China.

== See also ==
- List of Carex species
