= Carex lapazensis =

Conservation status
- Critically Endangered (IUCN 3.1)

Scientific classification
- Kingdom: Plantae
- Clade: Embryophytes
- Clade: Tracheophytes
- Clade: Spermatophytes
- Clade: Angiosperms
- Clade: Monocots
- Clade: Commelinids
- Order: Poales
- Family: Cyperaceae
- Genus: Carex
- Species: C. lapazensis

Binomial name
- Carex lapazensis C.B.Clarke

Species of sedge

Carex lapazensis is a tussock-forming species of perennial sedge in the family Cyperaceae. It is native to parts of Bolivia.

Carex lapazensis is a perennial, grasslike plant, which grows from a rhizome. Flowers are small, brownish-yellow, and clustered together in bunches of spikes.

According to the IUCN Redlist, Carex lapazensis is considered a critically endangered species.

== See also ==
- List of Carex species
