= Cyperus michoacanensis =

Scientific classification
- Kingdom: Plantae
- Clade: Tracheophytes
- Clade: Angiosperms
- Clade: Monocots
- Clade: Commelinids
- Order: Poales
- Family: Cyperaceae
- Genus: Cyperus
- Species: C. michoacanensis

Binomial name
- Cyperus michoacanensis Britton ex C.B.Clarke, 1908

Species of sedge

Cyperus michoacanensis is a species of sedge that is native to south western parts of Mexico.

== See also ==
- List of Cyperus species
