= Thyrsanthemum laxiflorum =

Scientific classification
- Kingdom: Plantae
- Clade: Tracheophytes
- Clade: Angiosperms
- Clade: Monocots
- Clade: Commelinids
- Order: Commelinales
- Family: Commelinaceae
- Subfamily: Commelinoideae
- Tribe: Tradescantieae
- Subtribe: Thyrsanthemineae
- Genus: Thyrsanthemum
- Species: T. laxiflorum

Binomial name
- Thyrsanthemum laxiflorum (C.B.Clarke) M.Pell. & Espejo

Synonyms
- Descantaria laxiflora (C.B.Clarke) G.Brückn; Gibasoides laxiflora (C.B.Clarke) D.R.Hunt; Tradescantia laxiflora C.B.Clarke

Genus of flowering plants

Thyrsanthemum laxiflorum is a species of flowering plant in the family Commelinaceae. It is a tuberous geophyte endemic to central and southwestern Mexico (Puebla, Morelos, Nayarit, Jalisco, Michoacán, Oaxaca).

The species was first described as Tradescantia laxiflora by Charles Baron Clarke in 1881. In 1978 David Richard Hunt placed it in the monotypic genus Gibasoides as Gibasoides laxiflora. In 2021 Marco Octávio de Oliveira Pellegrini and Mario Adolfo Espejo Serna placed in genus Thyrsanthemum as Thyrsanthemum laxiflorum.
