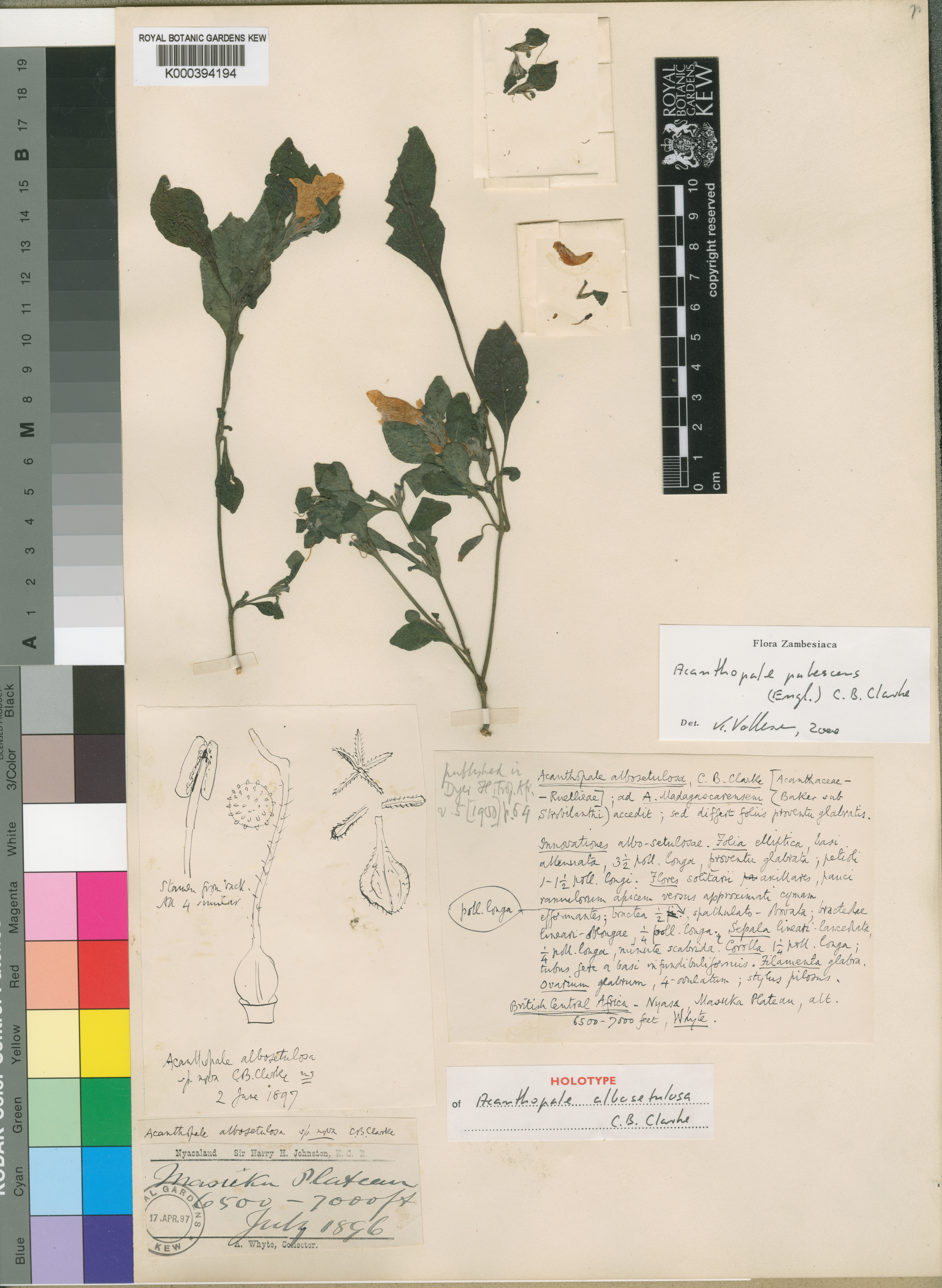
- Herbarium specimen at Kew Gardens

Scientific classification
- Kingdom: Plantae
- Clade: Embryophytes
- Clade: Tracheophytes
- Clade: Angiosperms
- Clade: Eudicots
- Clade: Asterids
- Order: Lamiales
- Family: Acanthaceae
- Genus: Acanthopale
- Species: A. pubescens

Binomial name
- Acanthopale pubescens (Lindau ex Engl.) C.B.Clarke

Synonyms
- Dischistocalyx pubescens Lindau ex Engl. Acanthopale albosetulosa C.B.Clarke; Acanthopale longipilosa (Mildbr.) Bremek. Dischistocalyx pubescens var. longipilosa Mildbr.

= Acanthopale pubescens =

Species of flowering plant

Acanthopale pubescens is a species of the genus Acanthopale of the family Acanthaceae. The species occurs in East and Southern Africa (except in South Africa). Acanthopale pubescensis also known as Herayye in Ethiopia.

== Description ==
Acanthopale pubescens is an erect, soft-wooded shrub or a shrubbery herb that can grow up to 2.5 m tall. The leaves are oppositely arranged and the largest leaves are 8–24 cm long, ovate to elliptic with distinct drip tip and are narrow at the base and apex. The Flowers are hermaphroditic and have radial symmetry and the Inflorescences are lateral with terminal racemose heads and hairy on the inside. The flower is white with purple marking and the corolla is hairy on the outside. Corollas can be up to 3 cm long and vary in size. The corolla consists of the whorl of petals. The capsule is 11–14 mm long and seeds are ellipsoid to circular, and range from 3–4 mm.

== Taxonomical history ==
The species was first but incorrectly described by Gustav Lindau as Dischistocalyx pubescens in 1895. Adolf Engler later validly published the species (ex Engler). In 1899 C.B.Clarke transferred the species to the genus Acanthopale and published this in the Flora of Tropical Africa.

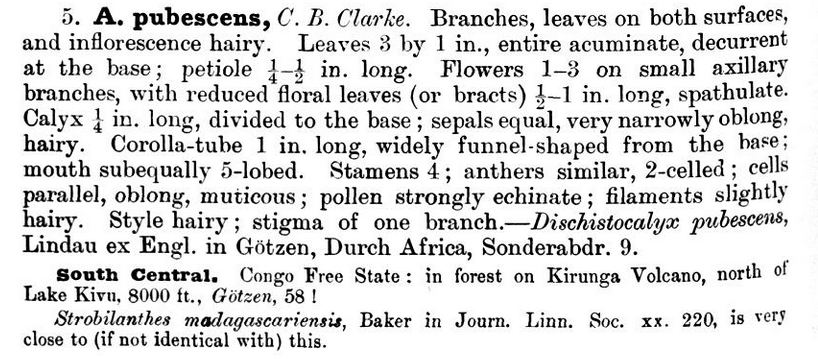
prologue of Acanthopale pubescens

== Distribution ==
Acanthopale pubescens is located in the most Afrotropic region, like Burundi, Rwanda, Uganda, Sudan, Ethiopia, Kenya, Tanzania, Malawi, Mozambique, and Zimbabwe. The Altitude range is 275-1150m and is found along the forest trails and in forest gaps.

== Morphology ==
Acanthopale pubescens can be herbs or shrubs and can grow up to 2.5 m tall. They have adventitious roots, called stilt roots. Stilt roots develop from the basal nodes of the stem near the soil, which supports the plant against wind. The leaves with petiole are 2–6.5 cm long with hair on the edges. The leaf shapes vary from lamina ovate to elliptic. The apex of the leaf also vary from acuminate to cuspidate and base of the leaf is attenuate with broad glossy hairs along midrib and veins.

Flower are arranged in racemoid head that are 3 cm long, peduncle is 0.5–23 mm long, winged, and vary from being hairy to hairless. The bracts of the flower are purplish, pedicles are 1 mm long. The Calyx is 5–10 mm long and can be found in different variety. Most of the flowers are usually white-hairy pubescent, the lobes are linear-lanceolate, and vary from acute to obtuse. The corolla is white with purple lines near the racemoid head. Also, the corolla is pubescent with glossy hairs. The stamen is 8–15 mm long, and can be acute or bifid at the apex. Lastly, the A. Pubescens have four ovules, which enables them produce maximum amount of seeds.

== Food ==
In Ethiopia, Acanthopale pubescens is found in the Sheka forest. The plant is used as food for goats. They are also found in another forest of Ethiopia, called the Odobulla forest, the local name for Acanthopale pubescens is Herayye and are eaten by Bale Monkey.
