= Cyperus mollipes =

Scientific classification
- Kingdom: Plantae
- Clade: Tracheophytes
- Clade: Angiosperms
- Clade: Monocots
- Clade: Commelinids
- Order: Poales
- Family: Cyperaceae
- Genus: Cyperus
- Species: C. mollipes

Binomial name
- Cyperus mollipes (C.B.Clarke) K.Schum., 1895

Species of sedge

Cyperus mollipes is a species of sedge that is native to eastern parts of Africa, and parts of South East Asia.

== See also ==
- List of Cyperus species
