= Cyperus pearcei =

Scientific classification
- Kingdom: Plantae
- Clade: Tracheophytes
- Clade: Angiosperms
- Clade: Monocots
- Clade: Commelinids
- Order: Poales
- Family: Cyperaceae
- Genus: Cyperus
- Species: C. pearcei

Binomial name
- Cyperus pearcei C.B.Clarke

Species of plant native to South America

Cyperus pearcei is a species of sedge that is found in South America in Bolivia and Peru.

The species was first formally described by the botanist Charles Baron Clarke in 1908.

== See also ==
- List of Cyperus species
