= Carex vaginosa =

Scientific classification
- Kingdom: Plantae
- Clade: Tracheophytes
- Clade: Angiosperms
- Clade: Monocots
- Clade: Commelinids
- Order: Poales
- Family: Cyperaceae
- Genus: Carex
- Species: C. vaginosa

Binomial name
- Carex vaginosa (C.B.Clarke) S.R.Zhang

Synonyms
- Kobresia cercostachys var. capillacea P.C.Li; Kobresia nepalensis var. vaginosa (C.B.Clarke) R.C.Srivast.; Kobresia nepalensis subsp. vaginosa (C.B.Clarke) T.Koyama; Kobresia vaginosa C.B.Clarke

Species of sedge

Carex vaginosa is a tussock-forming perennial in the family Cyperaceae. It is native to the Himalaya, Nepal, Tibet, and Yunnan province in south-central China.

== See also ==
- List of Carex species
