= Cyperus tweediei =

Scientific classification
- Kingdom: Plantae
- Clade: Tracheophytes
- Clade: Angiosperms
- Clade: Monocots
- Clade: Commelinids
- Order: Poales
- Family: Cyperaceae
- Genus: Cyperus
- Species: C. tweediei

Binomial name
- Cyperus tweediei C.B.Clarke

Species of plant native to South America

Cyperus tweediei is a species of sedge that is only found in the country of Argentina in South America.

The species was first formally described by the botanist Charles Baron Clarke in 1908.

== See also ==
- List of Cyperus species
