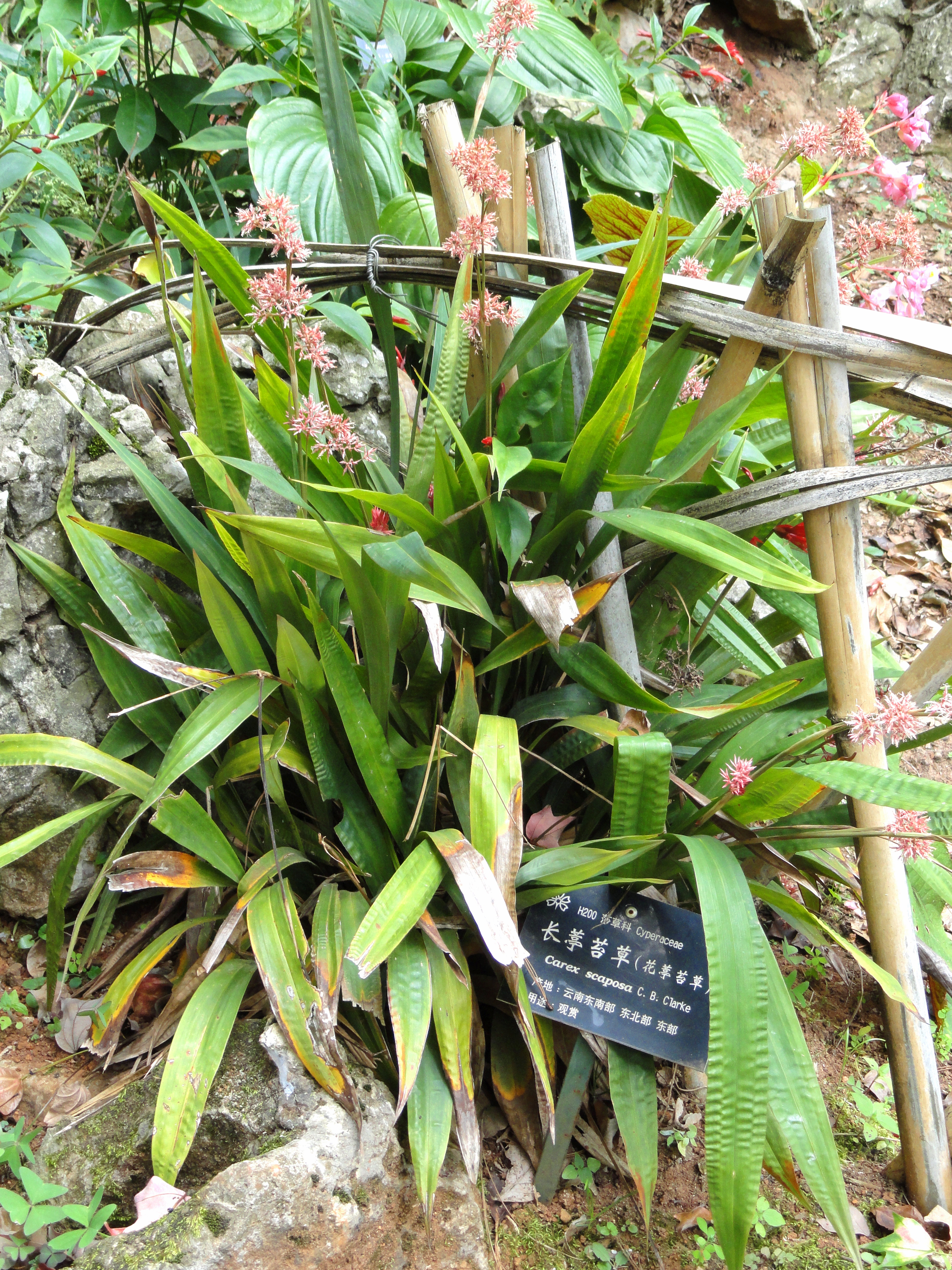

Scientific classification
- Kingdom: Plantae
- Clade: Tracheophytes
- Clade: Angiosperms
- Clade: Monocots
- Clade: Commelinids
- Order: Poales
- Family: Cyperaceae
- Genus: Carex
- Species: C. scaposa

Binomial name
- Carex scaposa C.B.Clarke

= Carex scaposa =

Species of sedge

Carex scaposa is a tussock-forming species of perennial sedge in the family Cyperaceae. It is native to eastern parts of Asia.

== Description ==
The sedge has a tufted habit and has a woody rhizome. The lateral culms have a triangular cross-section with a height of 20 to 80 cm (7.9 to 31.5 in) and a width of 0.1 to 0.3 cm (0.039 to 0.118 in) and are surrounded at the base by pale brown sheaths. It has tufted basal leaves along the length of the stem which can be shorter or longer than the culms. The glabrous leaves have an elliptic to elliptic-linear shape with a length of 10 to 35 cm (3.9 to 13.8 in) and a width of 2 to 5 cm (0.79 to 1.97 in) and a pointed end.

== Taxonomy ==
It was first described by the botanist Charles Baron Clarke in 1887 in Botanical Magazine. The type specimen was collected by Augustine Henry in China between 1884 and 1887. There are two varieties; Carex scaposa var. hirsuta and Carex scaposa var. scaposa. There are two synonyms; Carex pandanophylla and Carex scaposa var. marantacea.

== Distribution ==
The plant is native to temperate areas in south eastern and south central parts of China, in Vietnam and Taiwan.

== See also ==
- List of Carex species
