= Carex fissiglumis =

Scientific classification
- Kingdom: Plantae
- Clade: Tracheophytes
- Clade: Angiosperms
- Clade: Monocots
- Clade: Commelinids
- Order: Poales
- Family: Cyperaceae
- Genus: Carex
- Species: C. fissiglumis

Binomial name
- Carex fissiglumis (C.B.Clarke) S.R.Zhang & O.Yano

Synonyms
- Kobresia esenbeckii var. fissiglumis (C.B.Clarke); Kobresia fissiglumis C.B.Clarke

Species of sedge

Carex fissiglumis is a tussock-forming perennial in the family Cyperaceae. It is endemic from the eastern Himalaya through Nepal and Tibet to south central parts of China in Yunnan province .

== See also ==
- List of Carex species
