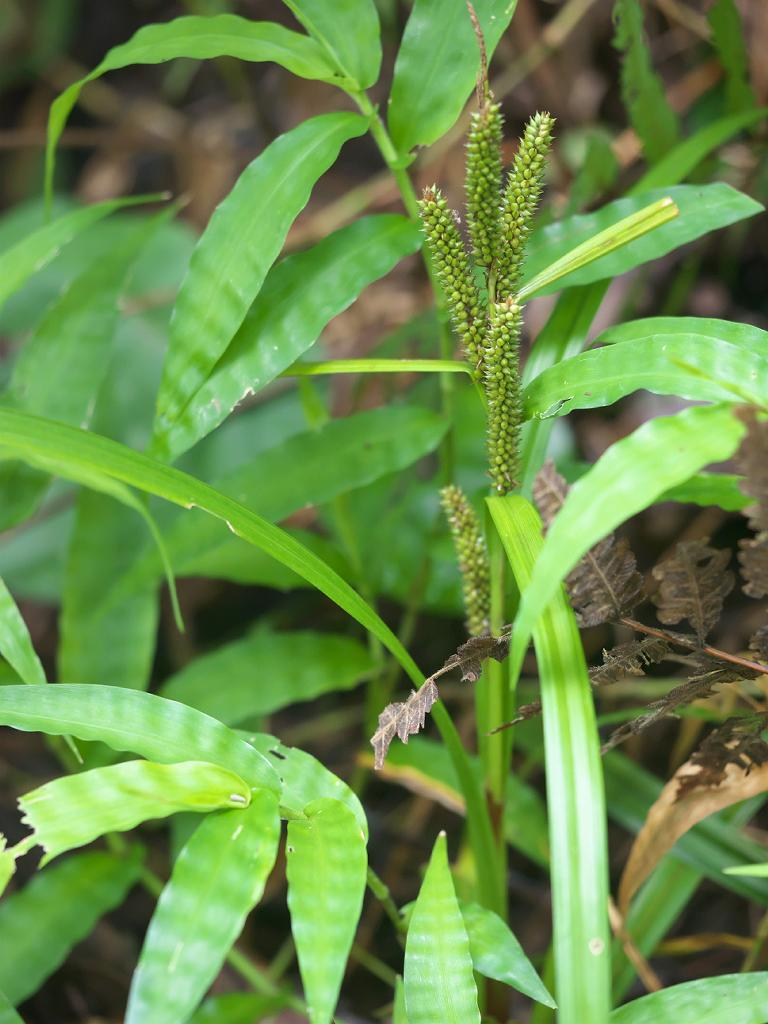

Scientific classification
- Kingdom: Plantae
- Clade: Tracheophytes
- Clade: Angiosperms
- Clade: Monocots
- Clade: Commelinids
- Order: Poales
- Family: Cyperaceae
- Genus: Carex
- Species: C. alliiformis

Binomial name
- Carex alliiformis C.B.Clarke, 1903

Synonyms
- Carex purpurascens Kük.

= Carex alliiformis =

Species of sedge

Carex alliiformis is a tussock-forming perennial sedge in the family Cyperaceae. It is native to eastern parts of Asia.

The sedge has a short rhizome with long running stolons that are covered in bladeless, red to brown coloured sheaths. The loosely tufted culms are quite thick with a triangular cross-section and are usually 25 to 45 cm (10 to 18 in) in height. The flat green leaves are mostly longer than the culms and have a width of 7 to 14 mm (0.28 to 0.55 in) with two prominent lateral veins.

The sedge is found in eastern parts of China including the provinces of Hubei, Hunan, Sichuan and Guizhou. It is also found in Taiwan, Vietnam and Japan usually along forest margins, in forests or in open areas on the sides of mountains.

== See also ==
- List of Carex species
