= Cyperus cunninghamii =

Scientific classification
- Kingdom: Plantae
- Clade: Tracheophytes
- Clade: Angiosperms
- Clade: Monocots
- Clade: Commelinids
- Order: Poales
- Family: Cyperaceae
- Genus: Cyperus
- Species: C. cunninghamii

Binomial name
- Cyperus cunninghamii (C.B.Clarke) C.A.Gardner

Species of plant

Cyperus cunninghamii is a sedge of the family Cyperaceae that is native to Australia.

The perennial sedge typically grows to a height of 0.3 to 0.7 metres (1.0 to 2.3 ft) and has a tufted habit. It blooms between March and August producing yellow-brown flowers.

It is found on rocky hills, amongst quartzite outcrops, on ledges and in gullies in the Kimberley region of Western Australia where it grows in stony red sand-clay soils. It is also found in the Northern Territory, Queensland and South Australia.

== See also ==
- List of Cyperus species
