= Carex rubrobrunnea =

Scientific classification
- Kingdom: Plantae
- Clade: Tracheophytes
- Clade: Angiosperms
- Clade: Monocots
- Clade: Commelinids
- Order: Poales
- Family: Cyperaceae
- Genus: Carex
- Species: C. rubrobrunnea

Binomial name
- Carex rubrobrunnea C.B.Clarke

Species of sedge

Carex rubrobrunnea is a tussock-forming species of perennial sedge in the family Cyperaceae. It is native to parts of eastern Asia from Assam in India in the west to China and Vietnam in the east.

== See also ==
- List of Carex species
