= Vaccinium sikkimense =

Scientific classification
- Kingdom: Plantae
- Clade: Embryophytes
- Clade: Tracheophytes
- Clade: Spermatophytes
- Clade: Angiosperms
- Clade: Eudicots
- Clade: Asterids
- Order: Ericales
- Family: Ericaceae
- Genus: Vaccinium
- Section: Vaccinium sect. Galeopetalum
- Species: V. sikkimense

Binomial name
- Vaccinium sikkimense C.B.Clarke

Synonyms

Species of flowering plant

Vaccinium sikkimense is an Asian species of flowering plant in the family Ericaceae. It was first described by Charles Baron Clarke in 1882 and may only be a dwarf alpine form of Vaccinium glaucoalbum.

== Description ==
Vaccinium sikkimense is a small, rather rigid, evergreen shrub, reaching up to 1 metre (3 1/2 feet) in height. Its leaves are pointed oval in shape, hairless, somewhat leathery, toothed, and about 2.5 centimetres (1 inch) long. They are densely arranged on the stems.

In July, pink flowers are produced in axillary and terminal clusters, which have pink bracts. The corolla is about 5 millimetres (1/4 in) long. The blue-black fruits ripen in August and September.

== Taxonomy ==
Vaccinium sikkimense was first collected by Joseph Dalton Hooker in Lachen, Sikkim, and described for science by Charles Baron Clarke in the third volume of Hooker's Flora of British India, published in 1882. In the same work, Clarke also described Vaccinium glaucoalbum (attributing the name to Hooker). Some sources agree this is a separate species, while others treat it as the accepted name for V. sikkimense. V. sikkimense may only be the dwarfed alpine form of V. glaucoalbum.

== Distribution and habitat ==
Vaccinium sikkimense is distributed from the eastern Himalayas, through northeast Nepal and southeast Tibet into western South Central China and northwest Myanmar (Burma). It has not been recorded from either Bhutan or Arunachal Pradesh, giving it a disjunct distribution. It was originally collected at an altitude of 4,000 m (13,000 ft), and was later collected at around 3,600 m (11,800 ft) in open woodland.

== Cultivation ==
The species was collected by several of the early pioneers of botanical collecting in the Himalayas, including George Forrest, Joseph Rock and Frank Kingdon-Ward. Of these, only Kingdon-Ward appears to have introduced living material to cultivation, in 1931 and 1953. It was collected again and brought into cultivation in 1981, by Tony Schilling. A hardy ornamental shrub, it remains rare in cultivation, although grown in public gardens in several parts of Great Britain.

== Uses ==
One source describes the fruits as "excellent eating".
