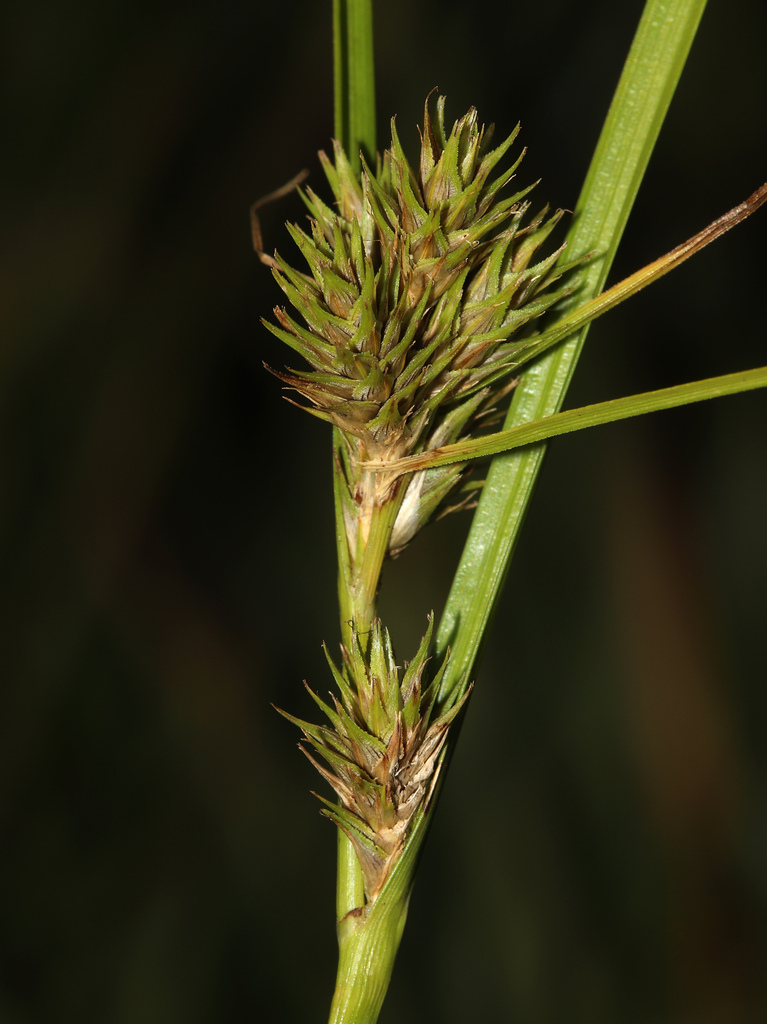

Conservation status
- Least Concern (IUCN 3.1)

Scientific classification
- Kingdom: Plantae
- Clade: Tracheophytes
- Clade: Angiosperms
- Clade: Monocots
- Clade: Commelinids
- Order: Poales
- Family: Cyperaceae
- Genus: Carex
- Species: C. lophocarpa

Binomial name
- Carex lophocarpa C.B.Clarke

= Carex lophocarpa =

Species of sedge

Carex lophocarpa is a tussock-forming species of perennial sedge in the family Cyperaceae. It was first described in 1908 by Charles Baron Clarke.

It is native to eastern Australia, where it is found in both Queensland and New South Wales, in damp places in woodlands and forests.

== See also ==
- List of Carex species
