= Carex chlorosaccus =

Conservation status
- Endangered (IUCN 3.1)

Scientific classification
- Kingdom: Plantae
- Clade: Tracheophytes
- Clade: Angiosperms
- Clade: Monocots
- Clade: Commelinids
- Order: Poales
- Family: Cyperaceae
- Genus: Carex
- Species: C. chlorosaccus

Binomial name
- Carex chlorosaccus C.B.Clarke

Synonyms
- Carex brassii Nelmes; Carex leptocladus C.B.Clarke

Species of plant

Carex chlorosaccus (syn. Carex brassii) is a species of sedge in the family Cyperaceae, native to the Gulf of Guinea islands, southwestern Cameroon, and central and eastern tropical Africa. It is typically found in upland grasslands and the understories of montane forests.
