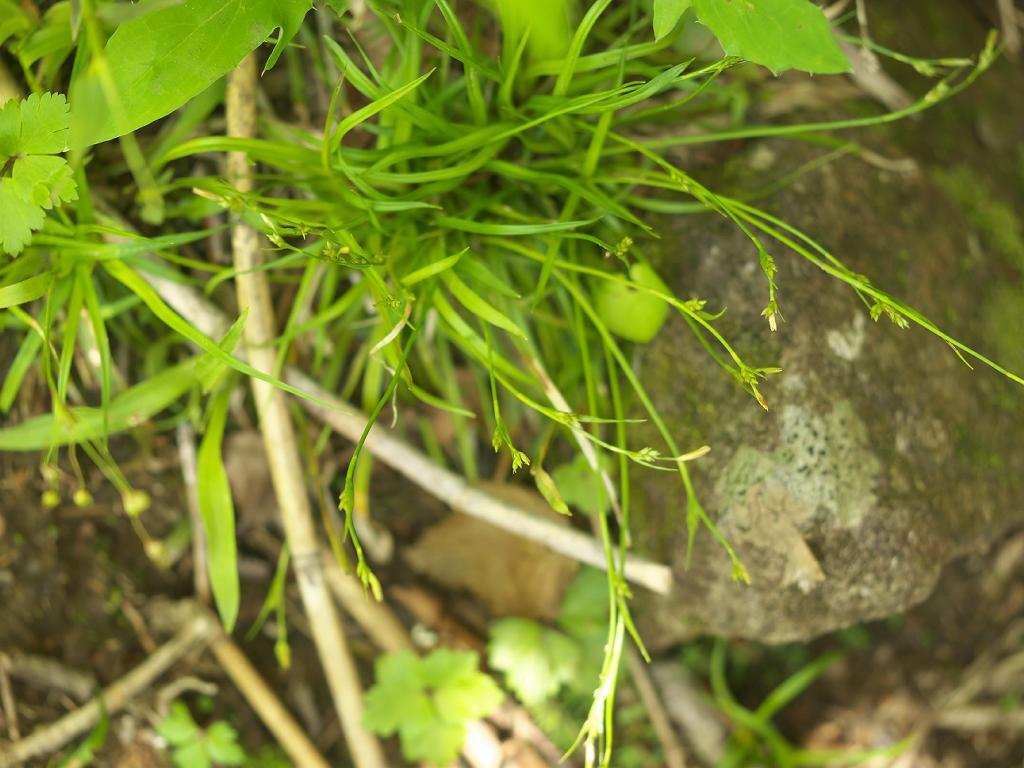
- Carex jacens

Scientific classification
- Kingdom: Plantae
- Clade: Tracheophytes
- Clade: Angiosperms
- Clade: Monocots
- Clade: Commelinids
- Order: Poales
- Family: Cyperaceae
- Genus: Carex
- Species: C. jacens

Binomial name
- Carex jacens C.B.Clarke

= Carex jacens =

Species of sedge

Carex jacens is a tussock-forming species of perennial sedge in the family Cyperaceae. It is native to Japan and the Kuril Islands.

== See also ==
- List of Carex species
