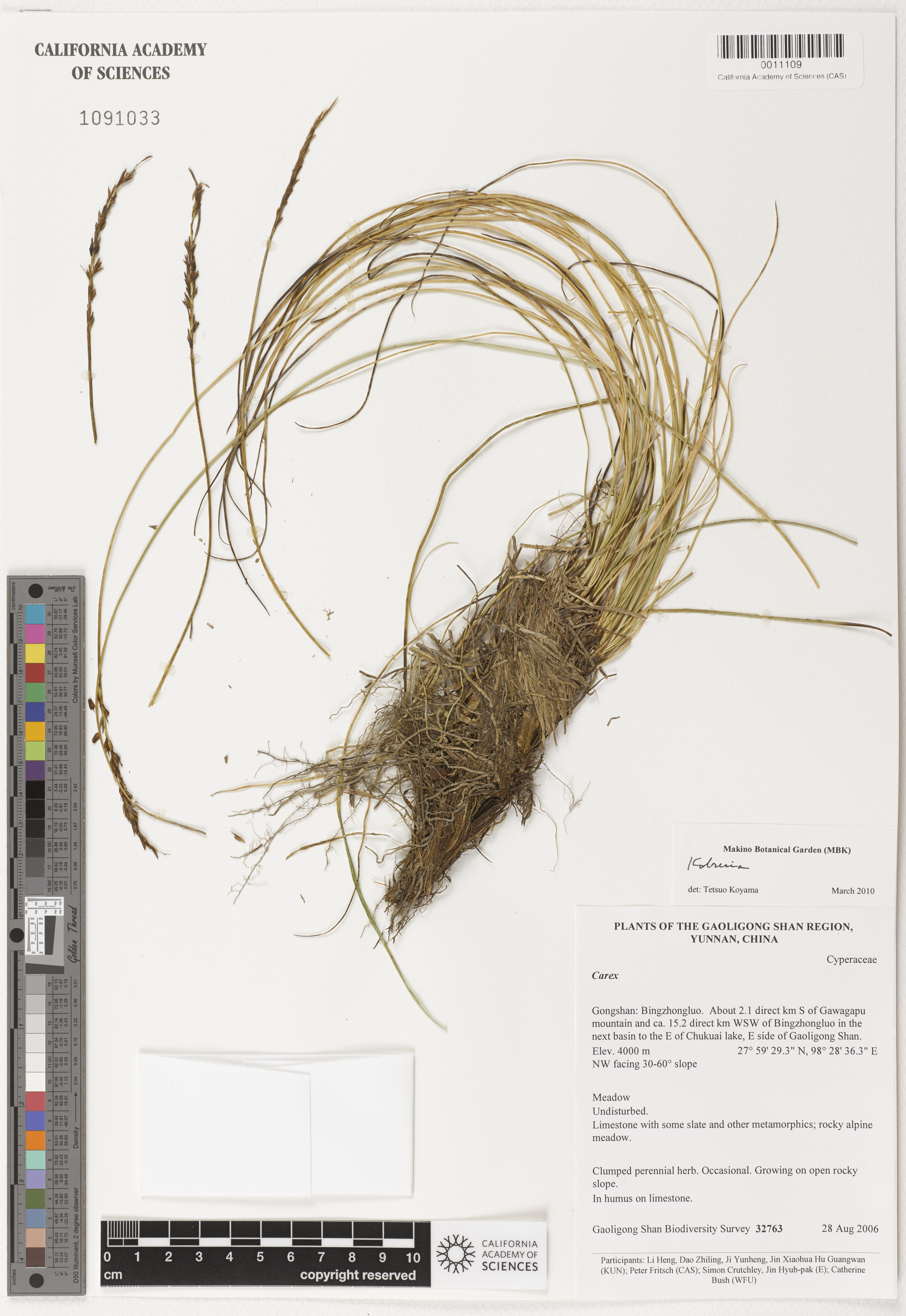

Scientific classification
- Kingdom: Plantae
- Clade: Embryophytes
- Clade: Tracheophytes
- Clade: Angiosperms
- Clade: Monocots
- Clade: Commelinids
- Order: Poales
- Family: Cyperaceae
- Genus: Carex
- Species: C. hughii

Binomial name
- Carex hughii S.R.Zhang

Synonyms
- Kobresia graminifolia C.B.Clarke

= Carex hughii =

Species of sedge

Carex hughii is a tussock-forming perennial in the family Cyperaceae. It is endemic to the Himalayas, Tibet, Nepal and central parts of China.

== Description ==
Carex hughii is a tufted grass that has a short rhizome. It has pale to yellowish brown, dull to shiny, basal sheaths that are prominent and persist over a long time. The erect and rigid culms are densely tufted and are typically 20 to 45 cm (7.9 to 17.7 in) in height and 1 to 1.5 mm (0.039 to 0.059 in) in width. The culms are triangular in cross-section. The leaves appear at the base of the plant are most commonly around the same length of the culms but can be shorter or longer. The leaves have a v-shaped to semi-circular shape in cross-section and are 0.5 to 1.5 mm (0.020 to 0.059 in) in width and have an indistinct midrib.

== Classification ==
The species was originally described as Kobresia graminifolia by the botanist Charles Baron Clarke in 1903 in the Botanical Journal of the Linnean Society. It was reclassified as into the Carex genus as Carex hughii by the Chinese botanist Shu Ren Zhang in 2015.

== Range ==
The species is found in subalpine to subarctic biomes and is found through the Himalayan Range, from Nepal in the south-west extending eastward through Tibet and South Central China through Qinghai province and west into western parts of North China.

== See also ==
- List of Carex species
