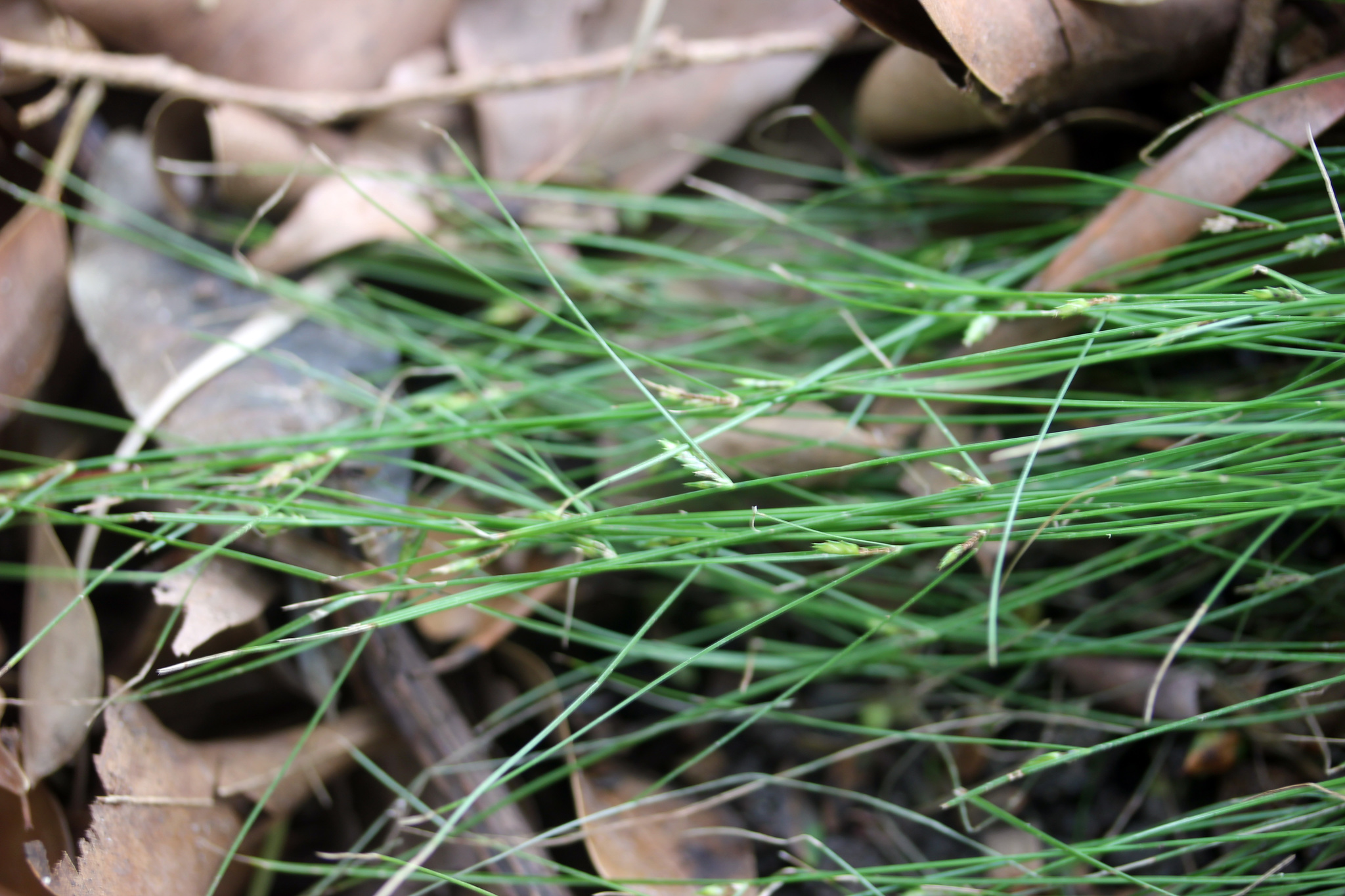

Scientific classification
- Kingdom: Plantae
- Clade: Tracheophytes
- Clade: Angiosperms
- Clade: Monocots
- Clade: Commelinids
- Order: Poales
- Family: Cyperaceae
- Genus: Cyperus
- Species: C. mirus

Binomial name
- Cyperus mirus C.B.Clarke, 1908

= Cyperus mirus =

Species of sedge

Cyperus mirus is a species of sedge that is native to eastern parts of Australia.
