= Carex subtransversa =

Scientific classification
- Kingdom: Plantae
- Clade: Tracheophytes
- Clade: Angiosperms
- Clade: Monocots
- Clade: Commelinids
- Order: Poales
- Family: Cyperaceae
- Genus: Carex
- Species: C. subtransversa

Binomial name
- Carex subtransversa C.B.Clarke

Synonyms
- Carex alopecuroides subsp. subtransversa (C.B.Clarke) T.Koyama; Carex japonica subsp. subtransversa (C.B.Clarke) T.Koyama; Carex hayatana Honda; Carex kawakamii Hayata; Carex pseudojaponica Hayata

Species of plant

Carex subtransversa is a species of flowering plant in the sedge family Cyperaceae, native to southeastern China (Zhejiang), Taiwan, the Philippines, and Japan. A rhizomatous perennial reaching 30 cm (12 in), it is found at elevations from 1,300 to 2,500 m (4,300 to 8,200 ft), typically in wet or grassy areas in forests.
