= Acanthopale decempedalis =

Conservation status
- Vulnerable (IUCN 3.1)

Scientific classification
- Kingdom: Plantae
- Clade: Tracheophytes
- Clade: Angiosperms
- Clade: Eudicots
- Clade: Asterids
- Order: Lamiales
- Family: Acanthaceae
- Genus: Acanthopale
- Species: A. decempedalis

Binomial name
- Acanthopale decempedalis C.B.Clarke

Synonyms
- Acanthopale laxiflora C.B.Clarke; Acanthopale cameronica Bremek.; Dischistocalyx laxiflorus Lindau

Species of flowering plant

Acanthopale decempedalis is a species of plant in the family Acanthaceae. It is found in Cameroon, Equatorial Guinea, and Nigeria. Its natural habitats are subtropical or tropical moist lowland forests and subtropical or tropical moist montane forests.
