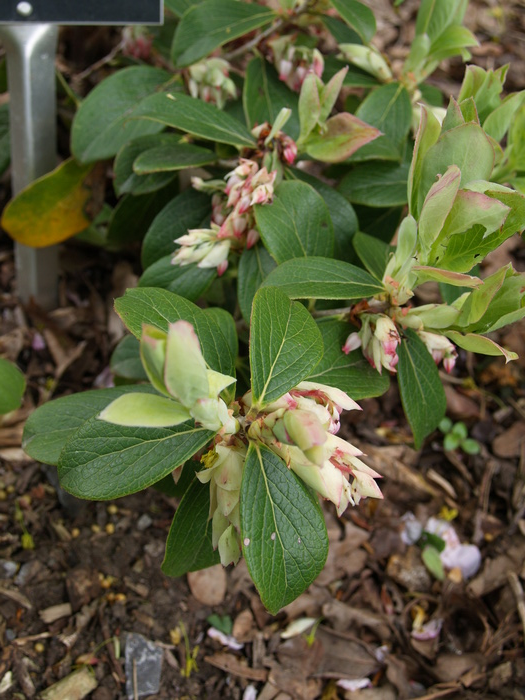

Scientific classification
- Kingdom: Plantae
- Clade: Embryophytes
- Clade: Tracheophytes
- Clade: Angiosperms
- Clade: Eudicots
- Clade: Asterids
- Order: Ericales
- Family: Ericaceae
- Genus: Vaccinium
- Section: Vaccinium sect. Galeopetalum
- Species: V. glaucoalbum

Binomial name
- Vaccinium glaucoalbum Hook.f. ex C.B.Clarke

= Vaccinium glaucoalbum =

Species of flowering plant

Vaccinium glaucoalbum, the grey-white blueberry, is an Asian species of Vaccinium.

== Description ==
It is an evergreen shrub with white-bloomed black berries.

== Taxonomy ==
Vaccinium glaucoalbum was first described for science by Charles Baron Clarke in the third volume of Joseph Dalton Hooker's Flora of British India, published in 1882. Clarke attributed the name to Hooker. In the same work, Clarke also described V. sikkimense, which some sources treat as a synonym of V. glaucoalbum, while others agree that it is a separate species.

== Distribution and habitat ==
The species is native to Nepal, the east Himalayas, Myanmar, Tibet, and Yunnan in China.

It grows in thickets and forest margins.

== Uses ==
The species has gained the Royal Horticultural Society's Award of Garden Merit as an ornamental. Local people collect and eat the fruit.
