= Cyperus aureobrunneus =

Scientific classification
- Kingdom: Plantae
- Clade: Tracheophytes
- Clade: Angiosperms
- Clade: Monocots
- Clade: Commelinids
- Order: Poales
- Family: Cyperaceae
- Genus: Cyperus
- Species: C. aureobrunneus

Binomial name
- Cyperus aureobrunneus C.B.Clarke

Species of plant =native to Africa

Cyperus aureobrunneus is a species of sedge that is native to Africa, where it occurs in Malawi and Zambia.

The species was first formally described by the botanist Charles Baron Clarke in 1901.

== See also ==
- List of Cyperus species
