= Carex deasyi =

Scientific classification
- Kingdom: Plantae
- Clade: Tracheophytes
- Clade: Angiosperms
- Clade: Monocots
- Clade: Commelinids
- Order: Poales
- Family: Cyperaceae
- Genus: Carex
- Species: C. deasyi

Binomial name
- Carex deasyi (C.B.Clarke) O.Yano & S.R.Zhang

Synonyms
- Carex caucasigena Melnikov; Carex pamiroalaica (N.A.Ivanova) Melnikov; Elyna schoenoides C.A.Mey.; Kobresia deasyi C.B.Clarke; Kobresia glaucifolia F.T.Wang & Tang ex P.C.Li; Kobresia lacustris P.C.Li; Kobresia maquensis Y.C.Yang; Kobresia pamiralaica N.A.Ivanova; Kobresia pamiroalaica N.A.Ivanova; Kobresia schoenoides (C.A.Mey.) Steud.; Kobresia septatonodosa T.Koyama

Species of sedge

Carex deasyi is a tussock-forming perennial in the family Cyperaceae. It is endemic to the Caucasus in the north east south to Afghanistan and Pakistan then eastwards through the Himalaya and into central parts of China including the provinces of Qinghai and Xinjiang.

== See also ==
- List of Carex species
