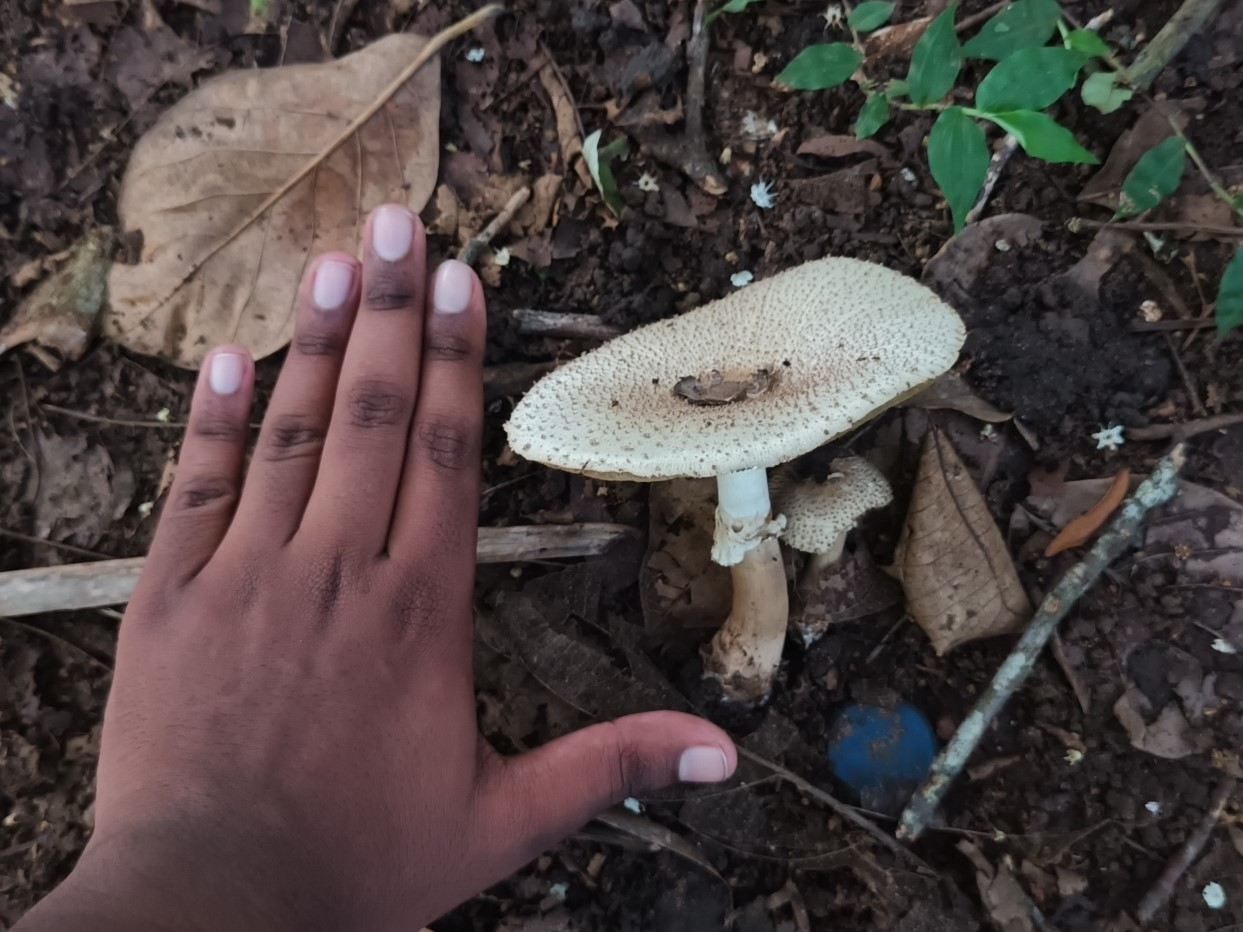

Scientific classification
- Kingdom: Fungi
- Division: Basidiomycota
- Class: Agaricomycetes
- Order: Agaricales
- Family: Agaricaceae
- Genus: Clarkeinda
- Species: C. trachodes

Binomial name
- Clarkeinda trachodes (Berk.) Singer (1951)

Synonyms
- Agaricus trachodes Berk. (1847); Fungus trachodes (Berk.) Kuntze (1898); Chitoniella trachodes (Berk.) Petch (1909)

= Clarkeinda trachodes =

Species of fungus

Clarkeinda trachodes is a poisonous mushroom in the family Agaricaceae. This agaric species is only distributed in South and Southeast Asia in countries such as Bangladesh, China, India, Indonesia, Malaysia, and Sri Lanka. It has both a partial and universal veil, and dark-colorer spores.

The official description of the species (as Agaricus trachodes) was first given by Miles Joseph Berkeley in 1847, from collections made in Sri Lanka. Rolf Singer transferred it to the genus Clarkeinda in 1951.

This species can be distinguished by the large size of their basidiome, their chocolate or coffee color, the presence of an annulus, and their slightly thick-walled spores and truncated apex.
