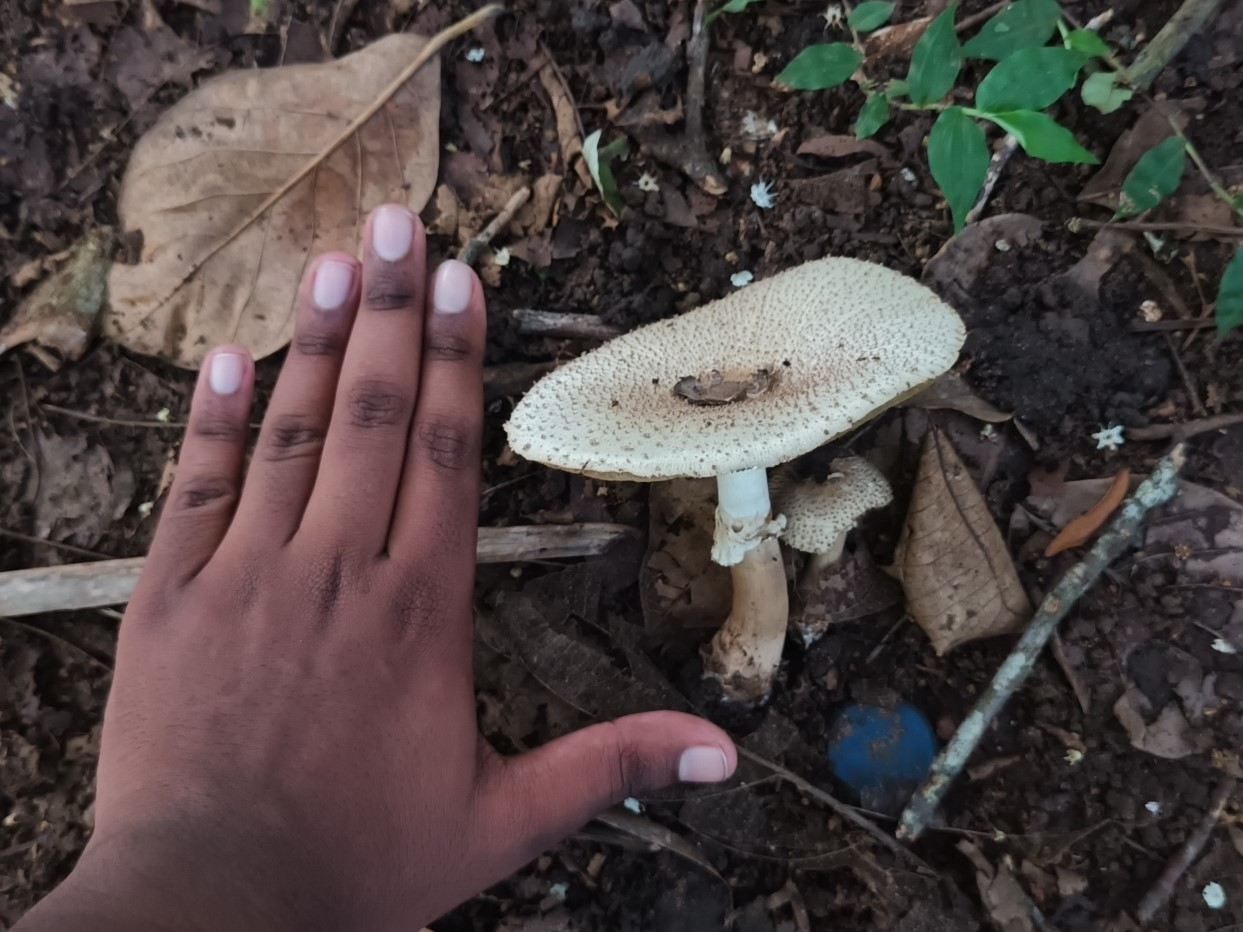
- Clarkeinda trachodes

Scientific classification
- Kingdom: Fungi
- Division: Basidiomycota
- Class: Agaricomycetes
- Order: Agaricales
- Family: Agaricaceae
- Genus: Clarkeinda; Kuntze (1891)

Type species
- Clarkeinda pedilia (Berk. & Broome) Kuntze (1891)

Species
- C. caparidensis C. coprinus C. pedilia C. pervolvata C. trachodes

Synonyms
- Agaricus subgen. Chitonia Fr. (1874); Chitonia (Fr.) P.Karst. (1879); Chitoniella Henn. (1898); Chitonis Clem. (1909)

= Clarkeinda =

Genus of fungi

Clarkeinda is a genus of fungi in the family Agaricaceae. According to the Dictionary of the Fungi, the widespread genus contains five species. Species in this genus, especially Clarkeinda trachodes, are only distributed in south Asia and southeast Asia.

== Taxonomy ==
Otto Kuntze circumscribed the genus in 1891. The first part of the generic name Clarkeinda honors British botanist Charles Baron Clarke, and -inda is derived from the Greek 'Iνδóς, meaning "pertaining to India".

== See also ==
- List of Agaricaceae genera
- List of Agaricales genera
