= Charles Baron Clarke =

British botanist (1832–1906)

Charles Baron Clarke FRS
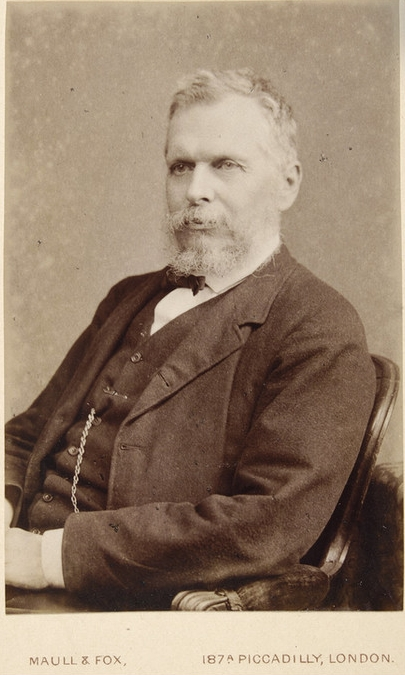
- Carte-de-Visite at the Royal Society, probably at the time of becoming a Fellow in 1882.
- Born: 17 June 1832; Andover, England
- Died: 25 August 1906 (aged 74); London, England
- Resting place: Richmond Cemetery
- Education: Cambridge University
- Scientific career
- Workplaces: Calcutta Botanical Garden
- Author abbrev. (botany): C.B.Clarke

Charles Baron Clarke (17 June 1832 – 25 August 1906) was a British botanist. He worked as a civil servant in British India in the Bengal education department. He was also keenly interested in botany and held the position of superintendent of the Calcutta Botanical Gardens from 1869 to 1871. During this period he became a specialist on the Cyperaceae and based on their distributions developed an influential phytogeographical classification of British India.

== Life and work ==
Clarke was born at Andover, the eldest son of Turner Poulter Clarke JP and Elizabeth née Parker. He was introduced into botanical tastes by his paternal grandmother Elizabeth Baron who was the sister of a founder of the Agricultural Society of Saffron Walden. He was educated at King's College School, London, and at Trinity and Queens' Colleges, Cambridge. He took a special interest in economics and was part of a group that included Henry Fawcett, Leslie Stephen, and John Rigby. He took an interest in climbing and travel and together with Leslie Stephen climbed Pillar (Lake District) and in the Swiss Alps. He was bracketed third wrangler in 1856. He began the study of law at Lincoln's Inn in 1856 and was called to the bar in 1860.

=== India ===
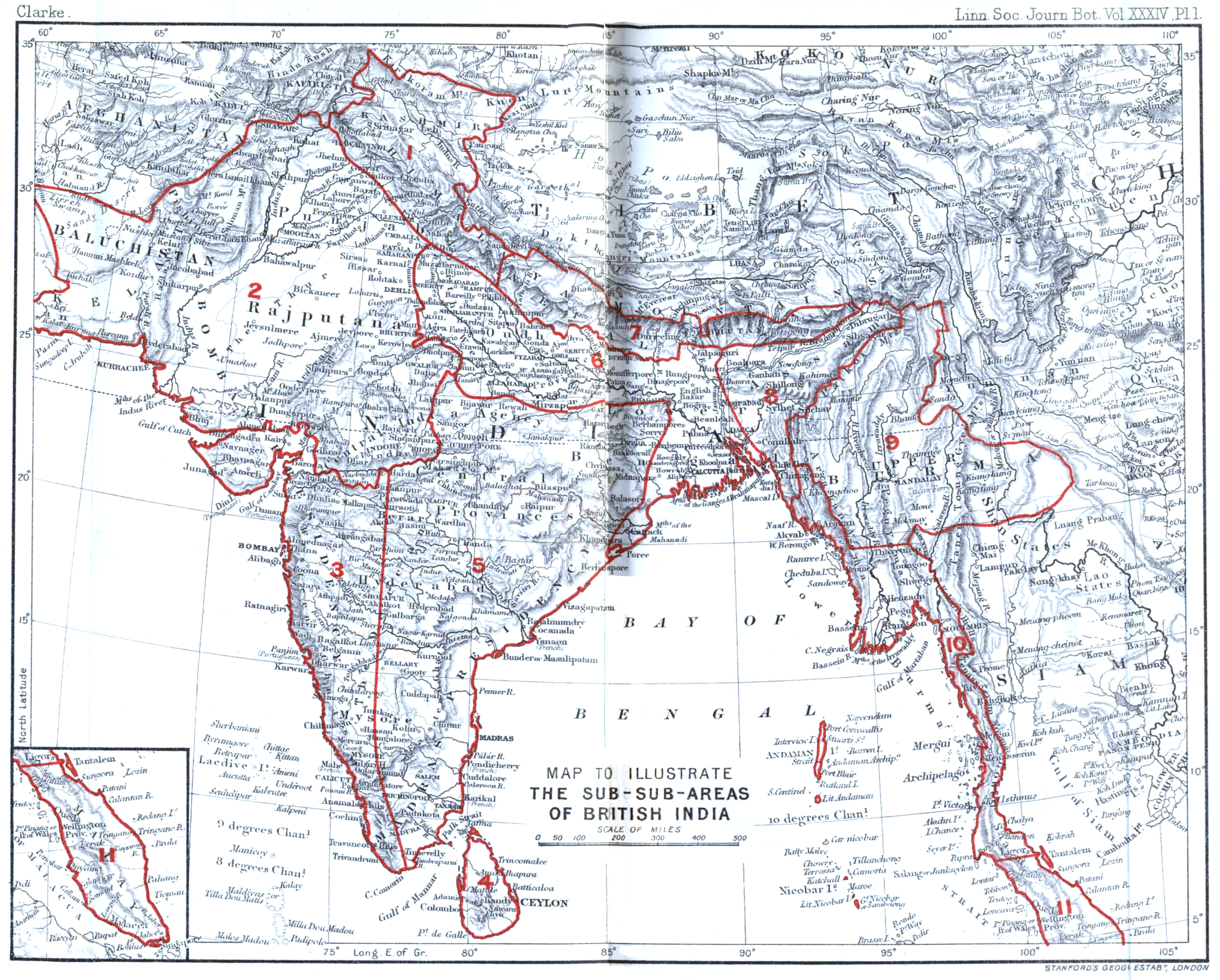
Clarke's 1898 phytogeographical classification based on the Cyperaceae (1) West Himalaya (2) India Deserta (3) Malabaria (4) Ceylon (5) Coromandelia (6) Gangetic Plain (7) East Himalaya (8) Assam (9) Ava (10) Pegu (11) Malay Peninsula

Clarke lectured in mathematics at Presidency College, Calcutta, from 1857 to 1865. Clarke joined the uncovenanted civil service in 1865 and became Inspector of Schools in Eastern Bengal and later of India, and superintendent of the Calcutta Botanical Garden from 1869 to 1871 in the place of Thomas Anderson (1832–1870). He travelled widely and by 1877, his botanical collections made for Kew included about 25000 specimens of nearly 5000 species. In 1879 he was put on special duty which included four years at Kew to assist Sir Joseph Hooker with work on the Flora of British India. He became director of public instruction in Bengal in 1884 and was transferred to Shillong (then in Assam) the next year. He utilized this period to explore the northeast of India. He retired from the Indian Civil Service in 1887 and lived near Kew along with his brother Poulter Clarke so that he could continue to work as a volunteer at the Royal Botanic Gardens Kew for the next nineteen years, right until his death. He also took an interest in music, mathematics, ethnography, geology and economics.

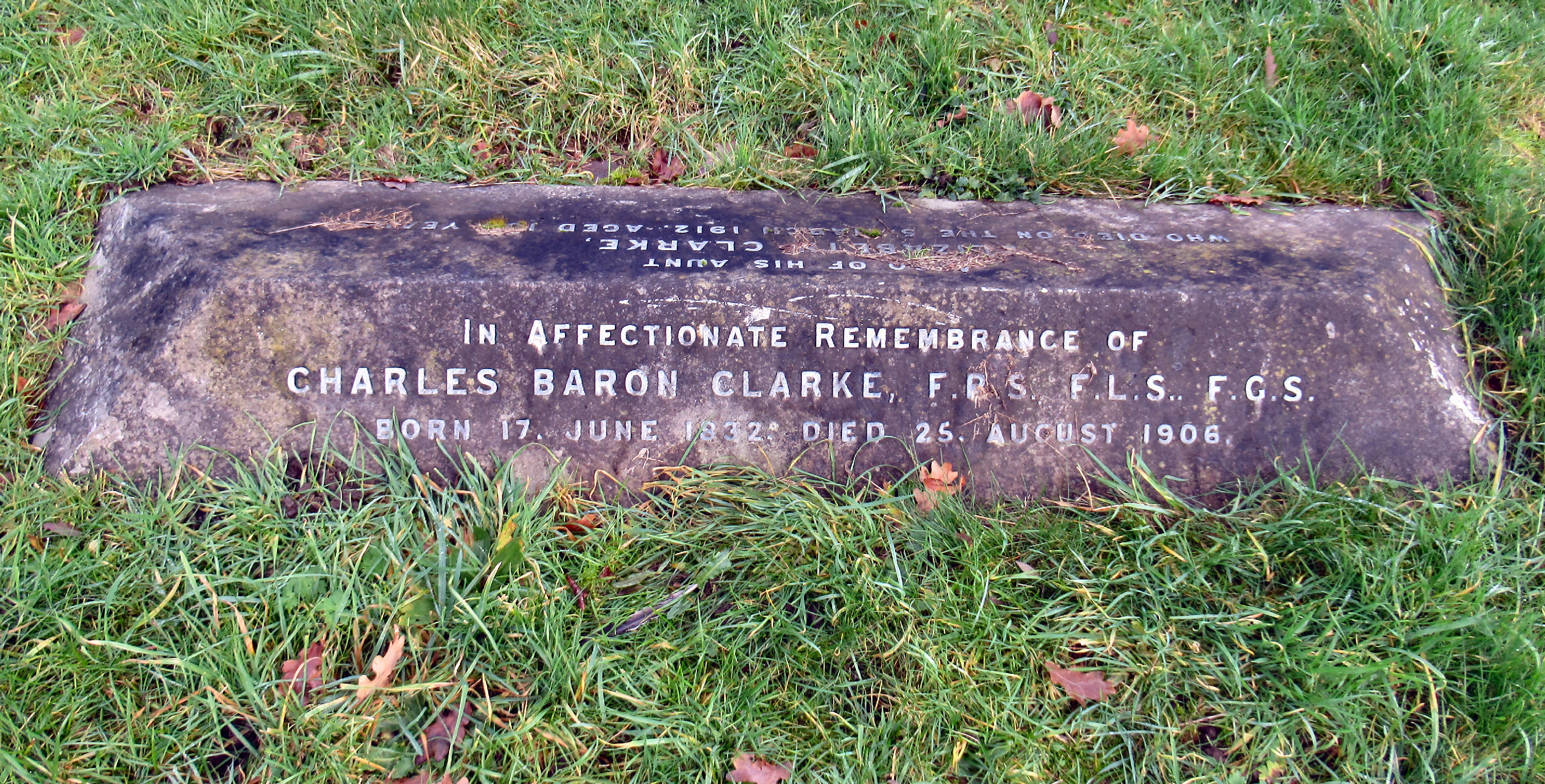
Richmond Cemetery

Clarke was president of the Linnean Society from 1894 to 1896, and was elected a fellow of the Royal Society in 1882. He died from internal inflammation caused by excessive bicycling and is buried in Richmond Cemetery.

There are number of plants named from his specimens with the specific name clarkei, including Iris clarkei, Clarkella, which is a genus of flowering plants in the family Rubiaceae. and also Clarkeinda, which is a genus of fungi in the family Agaricaceae.

== Bibliography ==
Clarke wrote several books and papers, including:

- The Cyperaceae of Costa Rica
- On the Indian species of Cyperus: with remarks on some others that specially illustrate the sub-divisions of the genus
- Illustrations of Cyperaceae
- Cyperaceae of the Philippines: a list of the species in the Kew Herbarium
- Philippine Acanthaceae
- The Subsubareas of British India
- Speculations From Political Economy (1886)
- A list of the flowering plants, ferns, and mosses collected in the immediate neighbourhood of Andover
- A class-book of geography (1889)
- The stone monuments of the Khasi hills (1874)

One of the most influential contributions was his biogeographical classification of British India which was based on his studies of the Cyperaceae. This was developed from Hooker's earlier biogeographical classification. He extended the work to a world biogeography in 1892 which agreed largely with the zoological distribution regions indicated by A. R. Wallace.
