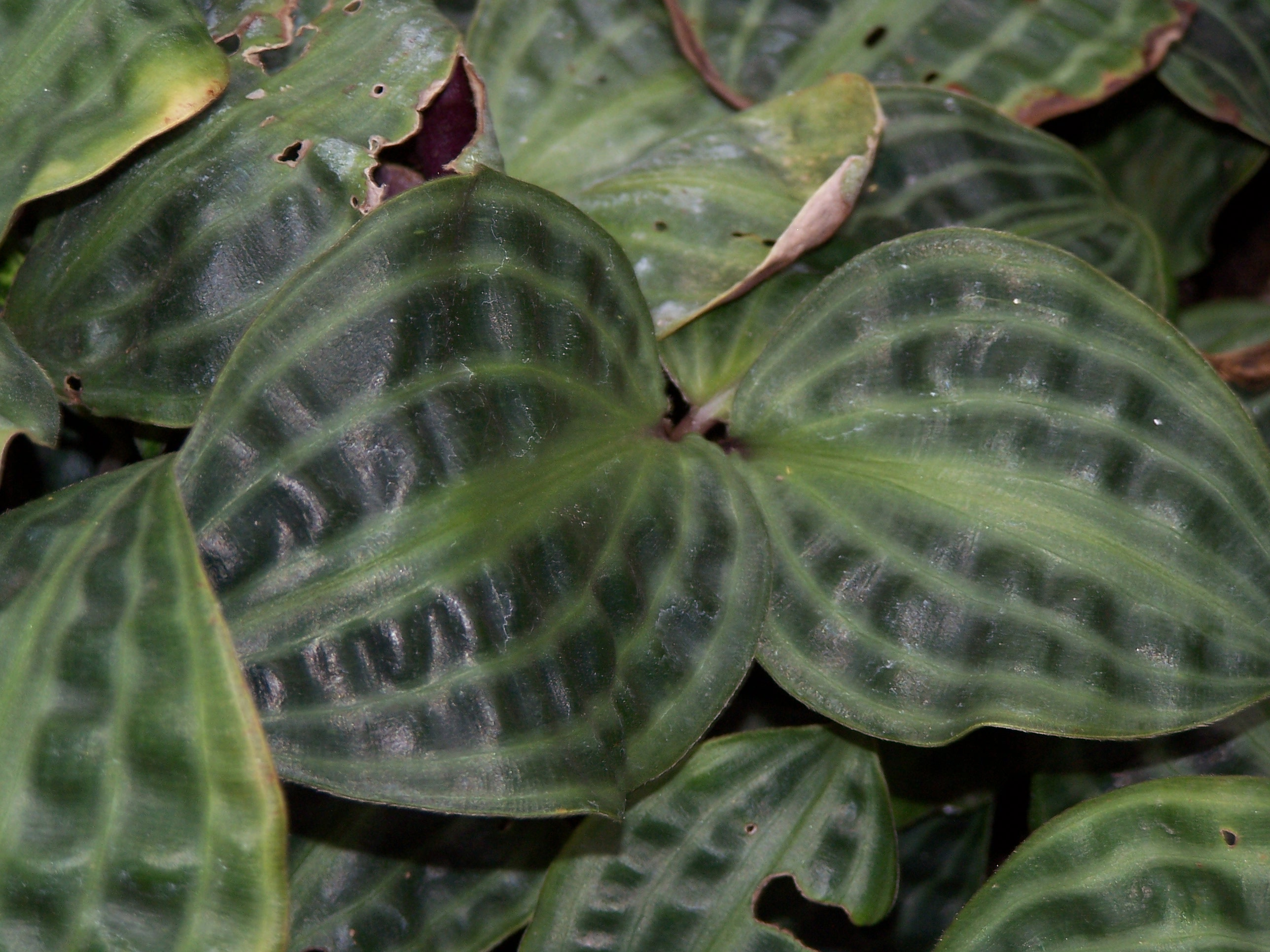
- Geogenanthus poeppigii

Scientific classification
- Kingdom: Plantae
- Clade: Tracheophytes
- Clade: Angiosperms
- Clade: Monocots
- Clade: Commelinids
- Order: Commelinales
- Family: Commelinaceae
- Subfamily: Commelinoideae
- Tribe: Tradescantieae
- Subtribe: Dichorisandrinae
- Genus: Geogenanthus; Ule

Species
- Geogenanthus ciliatus; Geogenanthus poeppigii; Geogenanthus rhizanthus

= Geogenanthus =

Genus of flowering plants

Geogenanthus is a genus of plants with 3 species in the family Commelinaceae (the spiderwort and dayflower family). The genus is distributed from Colombia to Amazonian Peru and Brazil. Two of its species (Geogenanthus ciliatus and Geogenanthus poeppigii) are occasionally found in the horticultural trade as house plants.

== Systematics ==
Geogenanthus is a member of the subtribe Dichorisandrinae of the tribe Tradescantieae of the flowering plant family Commelinaceae.

Image	Scientific name	Distribution
	Geogenanthus ciliatus	Ecuador through the lowlands of northern Peru.
	Geogenanthus poeppigii	Peru and western Brazil
	Geogenanthus rhizanthus	Ecuador

== Morphology ==
Aerial shoots unbranched and determinate in length, up to 0.75 m, with a terminal rosette of leaves. The leaves at lower nodes mere tubular leaf sheaths. All plant parts somewhat succulent. In the wild, plants grow on the floor of primary rainforests and possess a shallow underground, short, branching rhizome. Unlike its closest relatives in the family, Cochliostema and Plowmanianthus, its roots are both tuberous (although weakly so) and actually penetrate the soil.

Flowers consist of 3 green-brown sepals, 3 blue, pink or purple petals fringed with moniliform hairs, 4-6 stamens - the posterior three of which may be bearded with monilifiorm hairs, and 3 connate carpels. Its flowers have no fragrance detectable by the human nose.
