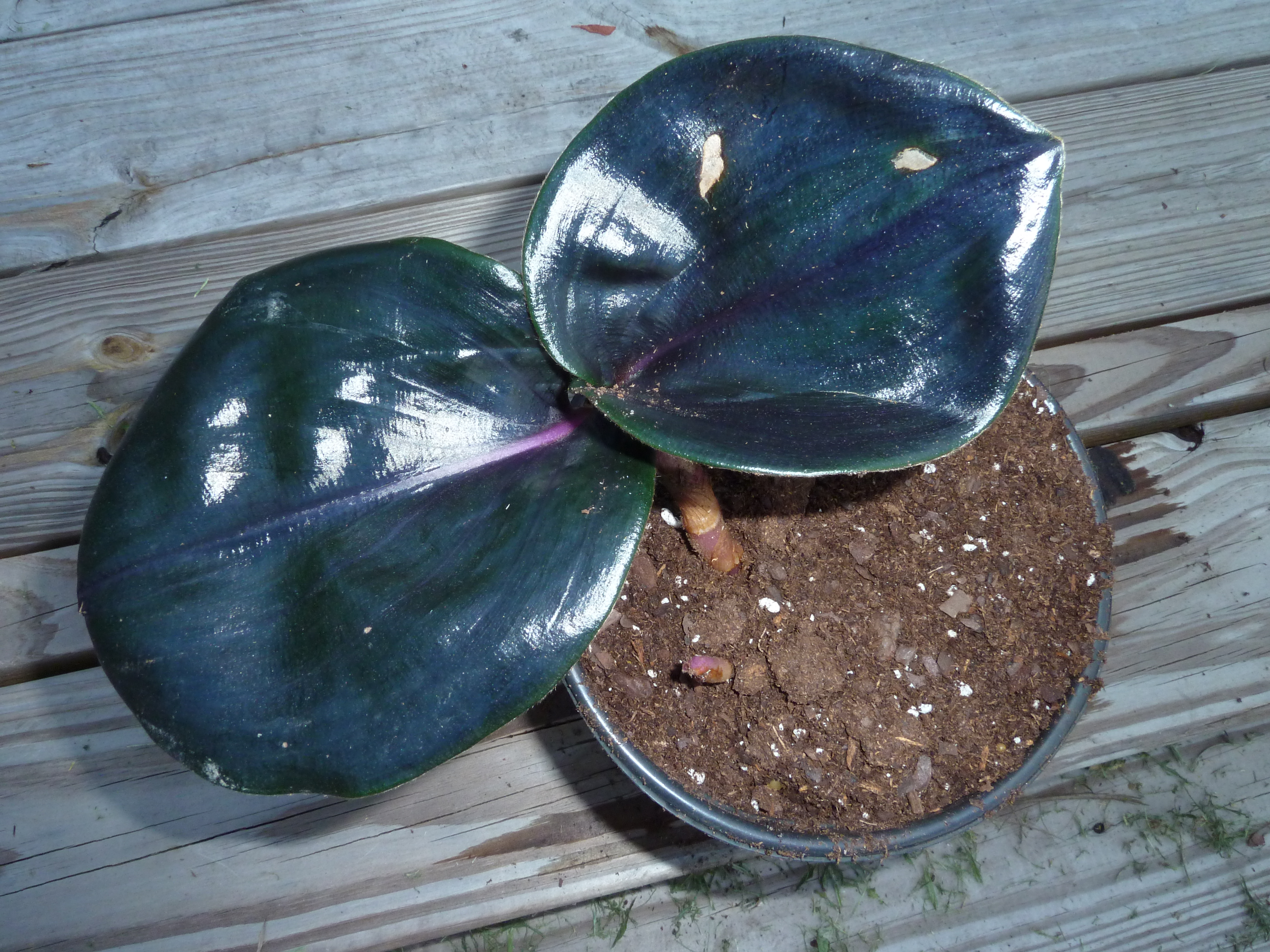

Scientific classification
- Kingdom: Plantae
- Clade: Tracheophytes
- Clade: Angiosperms
- Clade: Monocots
- Clade: Commelinids
- Order: Commelinales
- Family: Commelinaceae
- Genus: Geogenanthus
- Species: G. ciliatus

Binomial name
- Geogenanthus ciliatus Brückn.

= Geogenanthus ciliatus =

Species of flowering plant

Geogenanthus ciliatus is a flowering plant species in the family Commelinaceae (the dayflower & spiderwort family). As currently circumscribed, the genus Geogenanthus includes two other species, G. poeppigii and G. rhizanthus.

== Distribution ==
Native to Upper Amazonia, it has been documented from the mid-elevation, eastern slopes of the Andes in Ecuador through the lowlands of northern Peru. It is typically found on the floor of primary rainforests. This species is adaptable to a low light environments and it will occasionally appear as a house plant or conservatory plant in temperate climates.

== Morphology ==
The aerial stems of this species are characterized by just one rotund, succulent leaf at the apex (occasionally there are two leaves on an aerial stem). Other species in the genus have 3 (less commonly 2) or more leaves in a terminal rosette. The top surface of the leaves are glossy and dark green, whereas the bottom of the leaves are velvety, dark-purple. The flowers are borne on long (up to 5 cm) pedicels in a single, or sometimes two, scorpioid cymes on a short peduncle arising from the basal node(s) of the aerial stem. Flowers have 3 green-brown sepals, 3 blue or purple petals fringed with moniliform trichomes, 5-6 stamens, the three upper of which are bearded with moniliform hairs, and a single tricarpellate pistil.
