= G. poeppigii =

G. poeppigii may refer to:

- Gaultheria poeppigii, a heath shrub
- Geogenanthus poeppigii, a dayflower native to the Amazon rainforest
