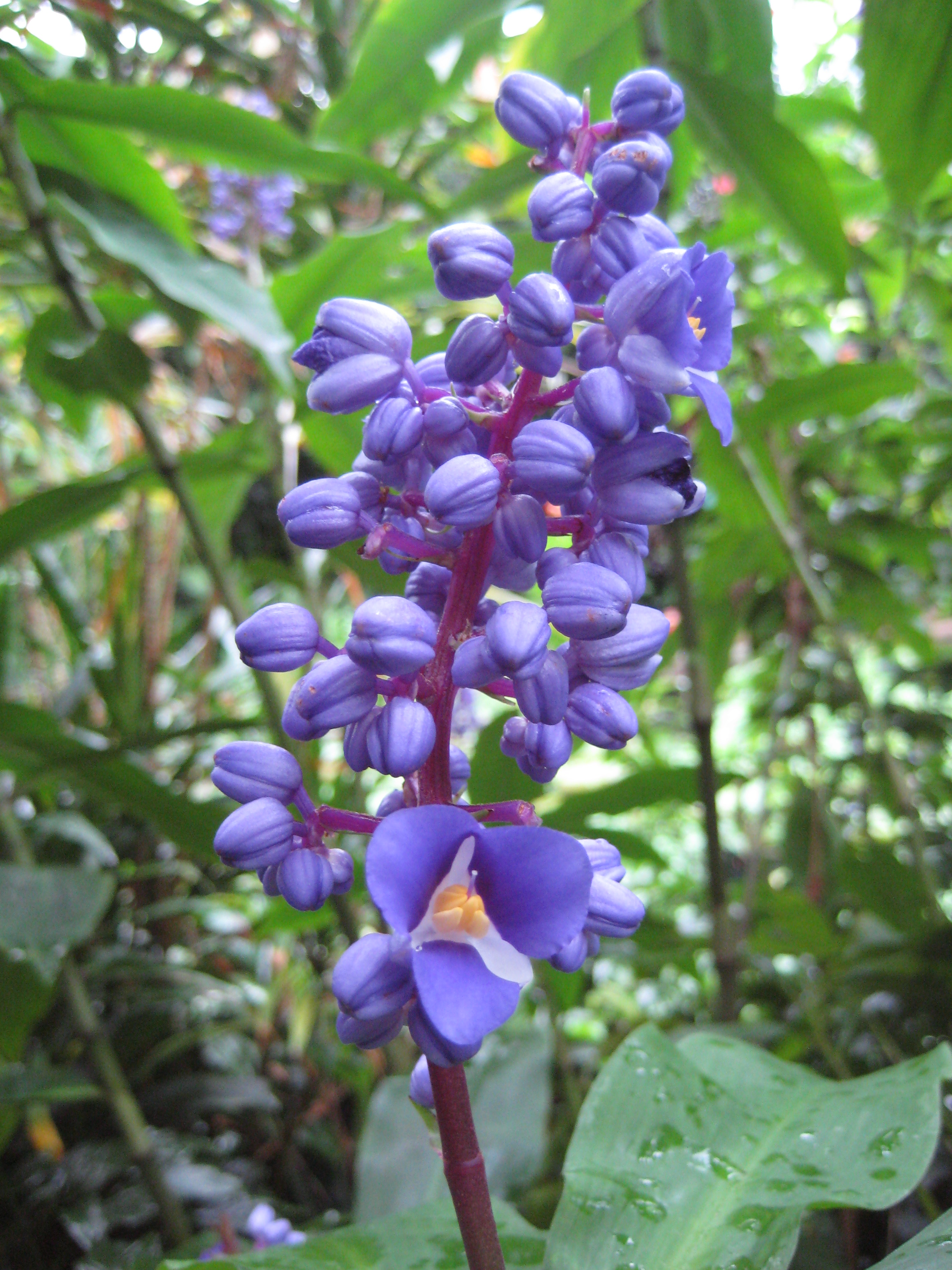
- Dichorisandra thyrsiflora

Scientific classification
- Kingdom: Plantae
- Clade: Tracheophytes
- Clade: Angiosperms
- Clade: Monocots
- Clade: Commelinids
- Order: Commelinales
- Family: Commelinaceae
- Subfamily: Commelinoideae
- Tribe: Tradescantieae
- Subtribe: Dichorisandrinae; Faden & D.R.Hunt

= Dichorisandrinae =

Subtribe of flowering plants

Dichorisandrinae is a subtribe within the tribe Tradescantieae of the flowering plant family Commelinaceae. It consists of 5 genera and around 51 species.

The subtribe represents a diverse assemblage native to tropical South America and a contiguous portion of Central America. Not only is this subtribe remarkable for the range of morphological and ecological variation within it, but it also includes species that represent novel exceptions to the terrestrial habit, longitudinally-dehiscent anthers, and/or exarillate seeds typical of the family. Exceptional taxa include Dichorisandra, characterized by the unusual combination of a vining habit, poricidal anthers, and arillate seeds. Cochliostema is atypical in having an epiphytic habit and flowers with spirally-coiled anthers concealed in petaloid extensions of the filament. Geogenanthus is distinguished by a particular 6-celled stomatal complex and basal axillary inflorescences. Plowmanianthus consists of prostrate herbs shallowly rooted in the leaf-litter layer of rainforest floors, and the flowers of most Plowmanianthus species are primarily cleistogamous.

== Genera ==
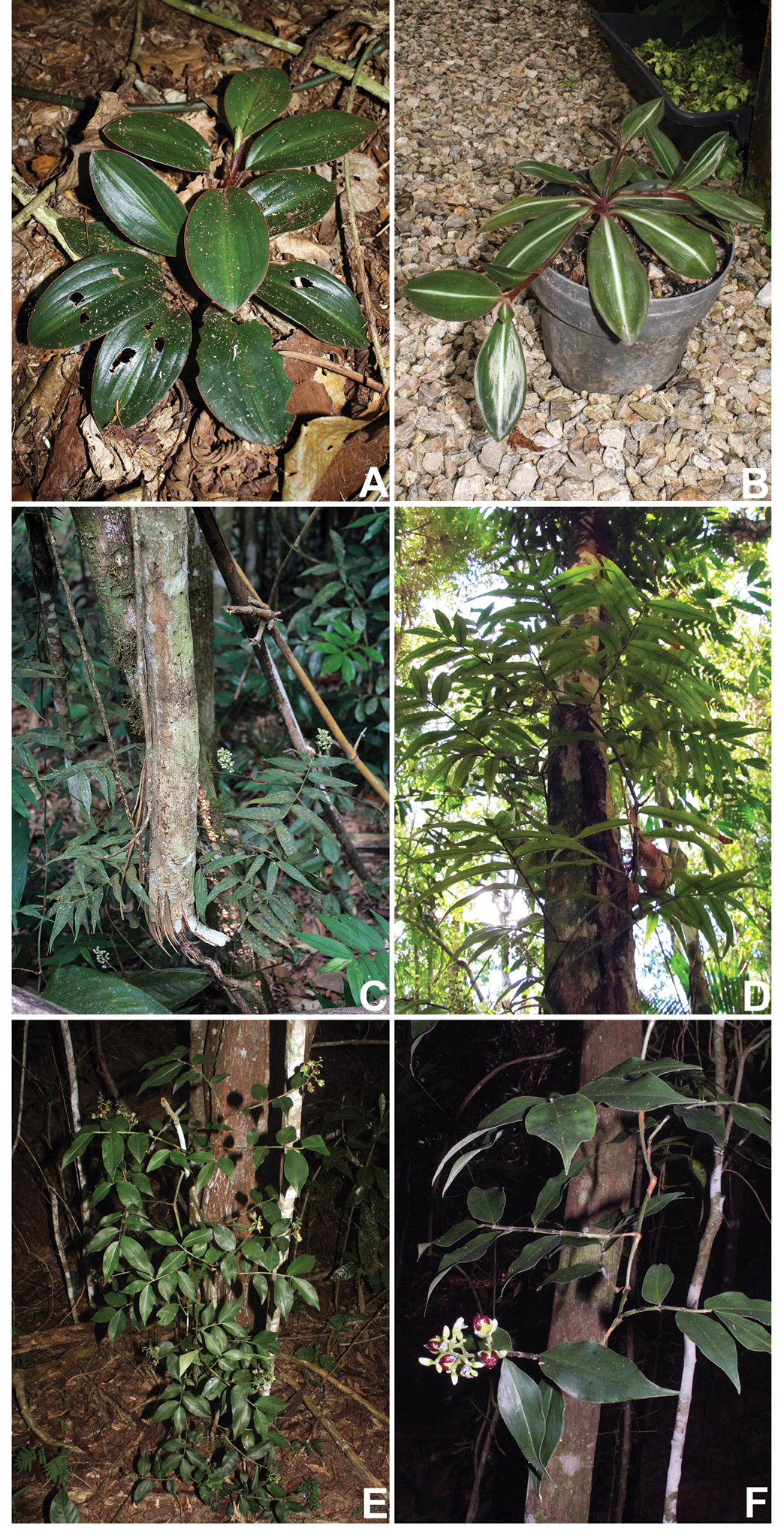
Growth forms in Dichorisandrinae

Faden & Hunt's (1991) formal circumscription of the subtribe did not include Plowmanianthus, which was then undescribed and poorly understood; Hardy & Faden added Plowmanianthus in 2004. Members are perennial, primarily understory, herbaceous taxa united on the basis of chromosome morphology (generally large), a shared base chromosome number (x = 19), and a biseriate arrangement of seeds in each locule (two longitudinal files of seeds in each locule), although the seeds are uniseriate in Plowmanianthus.

- Cochliostema Lem. – 2 species
- Dichorisandra Mik. – ca. 40 species
- Geogenanthus Ule – 3 species
- Plowmanianthus Faden & C.R.Hardy – 5 species
- Siderasis Raf. – 1 species
