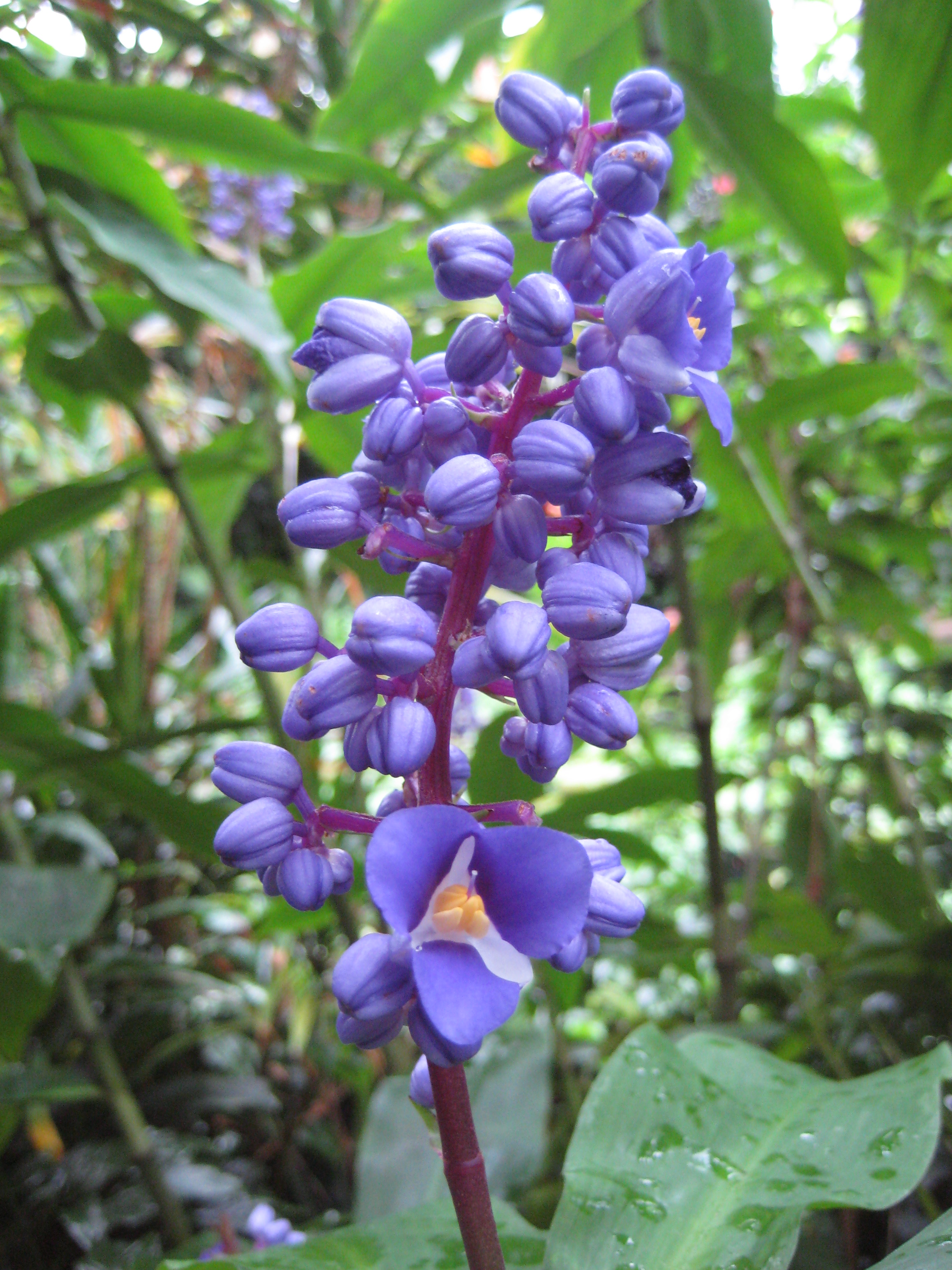
- Dichorisandra thyrsiflora growing at the Royal Botanic Garden Edinburgh

Scientific classification
- Kingdom: Plantae
- Clade: Tracheophytes
- Clade: Angiosperms
- Clade: Monocots
- Clade: Commelinids
- Order: Commelinales
- Family: Commelinaceae
- Subfamily: Commelinoideae
- Tribe: Tradescantieae
- Subtribe: Dichorisandrinae
- Genus: Dichorisandra; J.C.Mikan, 1820

Type species
- D. thyrsiflora J.C.Mikan

Synonyms
- Stickmannia Neck.; Petaloxis Raf.

= Dichorisandra =

Genus of flowering plants

Dichorisandra is a genus of perennial monocotyledonous flowering plants in the dayflower family (Commelinaceae). It is found in the Neotropics. The genus is characterised by its slightly zygomorphic flowers with large anthers usually releasing pollen by means of pores at the apex, as well as by its seeds that are embedded in a red or sometimes white aril, and tubers that often form at the tips of the roots. Both morphology and an analysis of DNA sequences indicate it is very closely related to the genus Siderasis.

Species

- Dichorisandra acaulis Cogn. - Bahia
- Dichorisandra alba Seub. & Warm. - Minas Gerais
- Dichorisandra amabilis J.R.Grant - southern Mexico, Central America
- Dichorisandra angustifolia L.Linden & Rodigas - Ecuador
- Dichorisandra begoniifolia Kunth - southern Brazil
- Dichorisandra bonitana Philipson - Ecuador, Colombia
- Dichorisandra conglomerata Aona & M.C.E.Amaral - Bahia
- Dichorisandra densiflora Ule - northwestern Brazil
- Dichorisandra diederichsanae Steyerm. - Guyana, Venezuela
- Dichorisandra fluminensis Brade - Rio de Janeiro
- Dichorisandra foliosa Kunth - eastern Brazil
- Dichorisandra gaudichaudiana Kunth - Brazil
- Dichorisandra glaziovii Taub. - southern Brazil
- Dichorisandra gracilis Nees & Mart - eastern Brazil
- Dichorisandra hexandra (Aubl.) Standl. - widespread from southern Mexico to Argentina
- Dichorisandra hirtella Mart. - eastern Brazil
- Dichorisandra incurva Mart. - Brazil
- Dichorisandra interrupta Mart. - eastern Brazil
- Dichorisandra jardimii Aona & M.C.E.Amaral - Bahia
- Dichorisandra leonii Aona & M.C.E.Amaral - Minas Gerais
- Dichorisandra leucophthalmos Hook. - southern Brazil
- Dichorisandra macrophylla Gleason - Minas Gerais
- Dichorisandra micans C.B.Clarke - Minas Gerais
- Dichorisandra mosaica Linden ex K.Koch - Peru
- Dichorisandra neglecta Brade - Espírito Santo
- Dichorisandra nutabilis Aona & M.C.E.Amaral - Espírito Santo
- Dichorisandra ordinatiflora Aona & Faden - Bahia
- Dichorisandra oxypetala Hook. - southern Brazil
- Dichorisandra paranaensis D.Maia, Cervi & Tardivo - Paraná
- Dichorisandra penduliflora Kunth - eastern Brazil
- Dichorisandra perforans C.B.Clarke - Brazil
- Dichorisandra picta G.Lodd. - southern Brazil
- Dichorisandra procera Mart. - eastern Brazil
- Dichorisandra puberula Nees & Mart. - eastern Brazil
- Dichorisandra pubescens Mart. - southeastern Brazil
- Dichorisandra radicalis Nees & Mart. - Minas Gerais
- Dichorisandra reginae (L.Linden & Rodigas) H.E.Moore - Peru
- Dichorisandra rhizophya Mart. - eastern Brazil
- Dichorisandra rupicola Aona & M.C.E.Amaral - Minas Gerais
- †Dichorisandra saundersii Hook.f. - Brazil but extinct
- Dichorisandra tenuior Mart. - southern Brazil
- Dichorisandra thyrsiflora J.C.Mikan - southeastern Brazil; naturalized in Peru + Java
- Dichorisandra ulei J.F.Macbr. - Peru, Ecuador
- Dichorisandra variegata Aona & Faden - Bahia
- Dichorisandra velutina Aona & M.C.E.Amaral - Espírito Santo
- Dichorisandra villosula Mart. - Brazil, Venezuela, Bolivia
