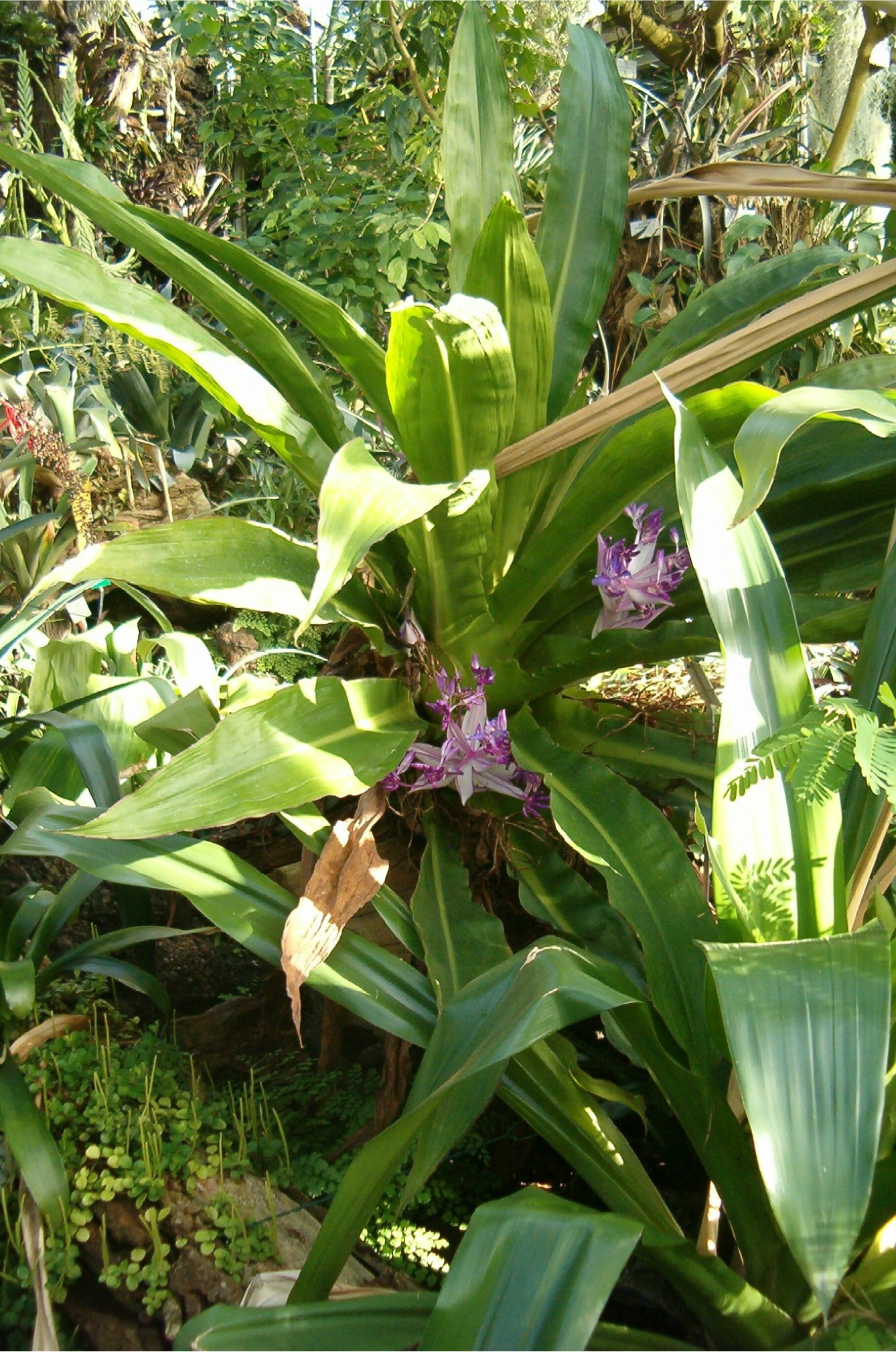
- Cochliostema odoratissimum

Scientific classification
- Kingdom: Plantae
- Clade: Embryophytes
- Clade: Tracheophytes
- Clade: Spermatophytes
- Clade: Angiosperms
- Clade: Monocots
- Clade: Commelinids
- Order: Commelinales
- Family: Commelinaceae
- Subfamily: Commelinoideae
- Tribe: Tradescantieae
- Subtribe: Dichorisandrinae
- Genus: Cochliostema; Lem.

Species
- Cochliostema velutinum R.W.Read; Cochliostema odoratissimum Lem.

= Cochliostema =

Genus of epiphytes

Cochliostema is a genus of plants with two species in the family Commelinaceae (the spiderwort and dayflower family). The genus occurs from southern Nicaragua to southern Ecuador.

== Systematics ==
Cochliostema is a member of the subtribe Dichorisandrinae of the tribe Tradescantieae of the flowering plant family Commelinaceae. Its closest relative in the Dichorisandrinae is Plowmanianthus, followed by Geogenanthus. All three genera share the possession of flower petals fringed with moniliform trichomes. Within Cochliostema there are two species: Cochliostema velutinum R.W.Read and Cochliostema odoratissimum Lemaire. Cochliostema jacobianum, a 19th-century name thought to represent another species and still popular among horticulturists, is considered as part of the latter species.

== Morphology ==
Rosette, typically unbranched herbs with somewhat succulent, strap-shaped leaves. In the wild, plants grow as epiphytes; however, terrestrial plants are found on or around tree falls suggesting that these ground-dwelling plants had been growing epiphytically. One species, Cochliostema odoratissimum, is a tank-epiphyte, resembling certain bromeliads in this respect. This species also attains the greatest size for the genus, with its leaves reaching to 1 m in length, and plants sometimes reaching 2 m in height.

Flowers are borne in large thyrses and are generally the largest (ca. 2.5 cm diam.), among the most fragrant, and arguably the most complex in the spiderwort family. They consist of 3 sepals, 3 blue to blue-violet and fringed petals, 3 stamens fused by their filaments in the upper half of the flower, and 3 carpels fused into a single trilocular pistil. The fused staminal structure has 3 spirally coiled anthers enveloped and concealed by petaloid extensions of the filaments of the two lateral stamens contributing to the 3-staminate structure. These structures, termed "cuculli", are narrowed into two distal hose-like extensions.
