= Plowmanianthus =

Scientific classification
- Kingdom: Plantae
- Clade: Tracheophytes
- Clade: Angiosperms
- Clade: Monocots
- Clade: Commelinids
- Order: Commelinales
- Family: Commelinaceae
- Subfamily: Commelinoideae
- Tribe: Tradescantieae
- Subtribe: Dichorisandrinae
- Genus: Plowmanianthus; Faden & C.R.Hardy

Species
- Plowmanianthus dressleri Faden & C.R.Hardy; Plowmanianthus grandifolius Faden & C.R.Hardy; Plowmanianthus panamensis Faden & C.R.Hardy; Plowmanianthus perforans Faden & C.R.Hardy; Plowmanianthus peruvianus C.R.Hardy & Faden

Genus of flowering plants

Plowmanianthus Faden & C.R.Hardy is a genus of plants with 5 species and 2 subspecies in the family Commelinaceae (the spiderwort and dayflower family). The genus is distributed from Panama to Amazonian Peru and Brazil.

== Systematics & Distributions ==
Plowmanianthus is a member of the subtribe Dichorisandrinae of the tribe Tradescantieae of the flowering plant family Commelinaceae. It has 5 species and 2 subspecies, all of which were described with the circumscription of the genus itself by Hardy and Faden (2004). Proceeding from the north to south and southeast of the genus's distribution, the taxa are as follows.

- Plowmanianthus dressleri is endemic to Panama, west of the Canal Zone.
- Plowmanianthus panamensis is endemic to Panama, east of the Canal Zone.
- Plowmanianthus grandifolius is native to Amazonian Ecuador, northern Amazonian Peru, and western Brazil. It consists of two subspecies.
  - P. grandifolius ssp. grandifolius is native to northern Amazonian Peru and western Brazil;
  - P. grandifolius ssp. robustus C.R.Hardy & Faden is native to Amazonian Ecuador and northern Amazonian Peru.
- Plowmanianthus peruvianaus is native to northern Amazonian Peru.
- Plowmanianthus perforans is native to southern Amazonian Peru.

== Taxonomy ==
The genus is named in honor of Timothy Plowman (1944–1989), an American ethnobotanist best known for his intensive work over the course of 15 years on the genus Erythroxylum, and the cultivated coca species in particular. It was first described and published in Syst. Bot. Vol.29 on page 316 in 2004.

== Morphology ==
Rosette, typically unbranched herbs with somewhat succulent, strap-shaped leaves. In the wild, plants grow on the floor of primary rainforests, shallowly rooted in the humus-rich and leaf-litter layers.

Plowmanianthus resembles its close relative, the epiphytic genus Cochliostema, but is smaller (its leaves reach only to ca. 30 cm in length) and is not epiphytic. Its flowers are also much smaller, lack the spirally coiled anthers of Cochliostema, and are usually cleistogamous (i.e., they usually never open).

== Other sources ==
- Hardy CR, RB Faden (2004) Plowmanianthus, a new genus of Commelinaceae with five new species from tropical America. Systematic Botany 29 (2): 316–333.
- Hardy CR, JI Davis, DW Stevenson (2004) Floral organogenesis in Plowmanianthus (Commelinaceae). International Journal of Plant Sciences 165 (4): 511–519.
