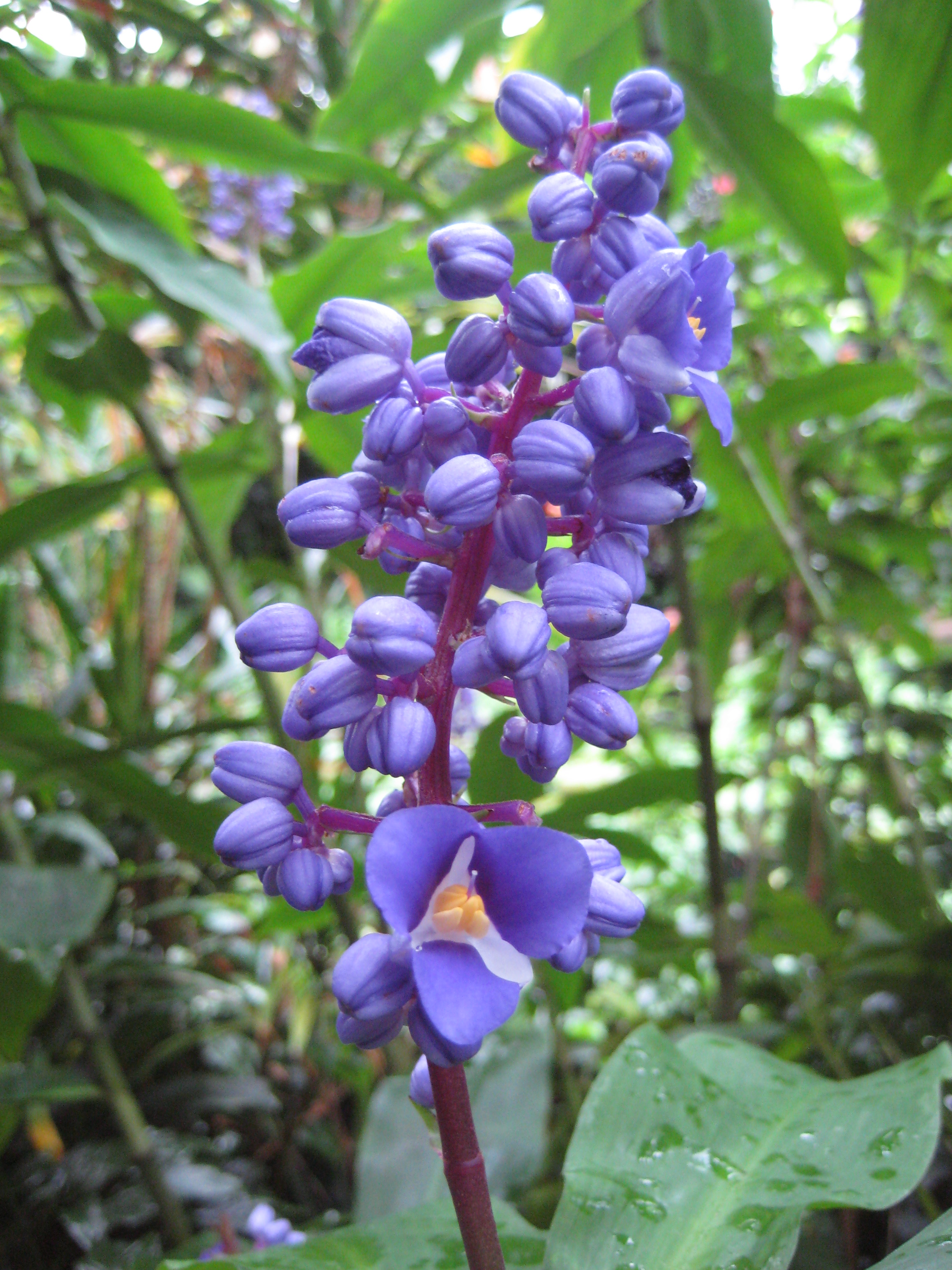

Scientific classification
- Kingdom: Plantae
- Clade: Tracheophytes
- Clade: Angiosperms
- Clade: Monocots
- Clade: Commelinids
- Order: Commelinales
- Family: Commelinaceae
- Genus: Dichorisandra
- Species: D. thyrsiflora

Binomial name
- Dichorisandra thyrsiflora J.C.Mikan

= Dichorisandra thyrsiflora =

Species of flowering plant

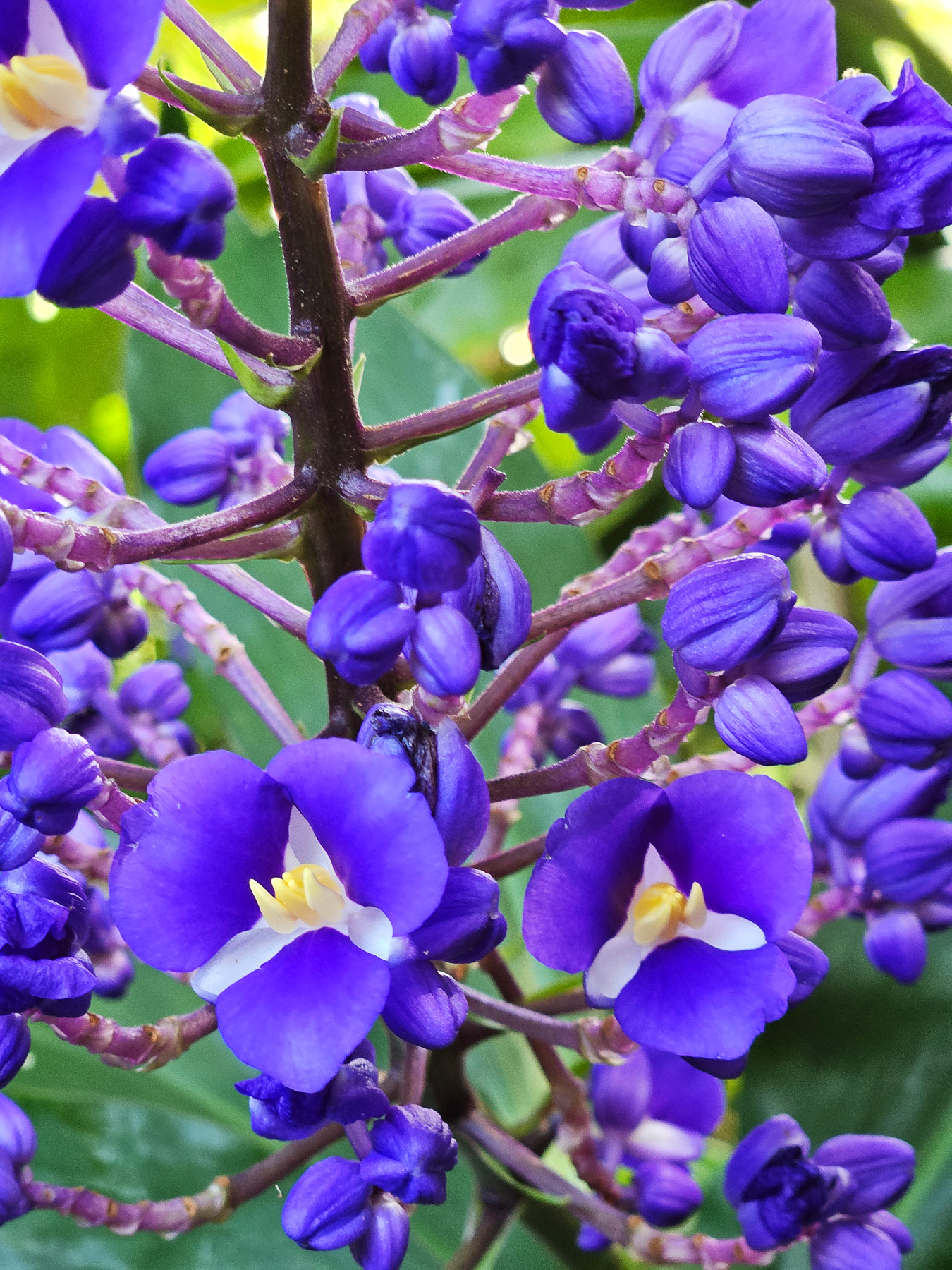
Dichorisandra thyrsiflora J.C.Mikan (Hawaii

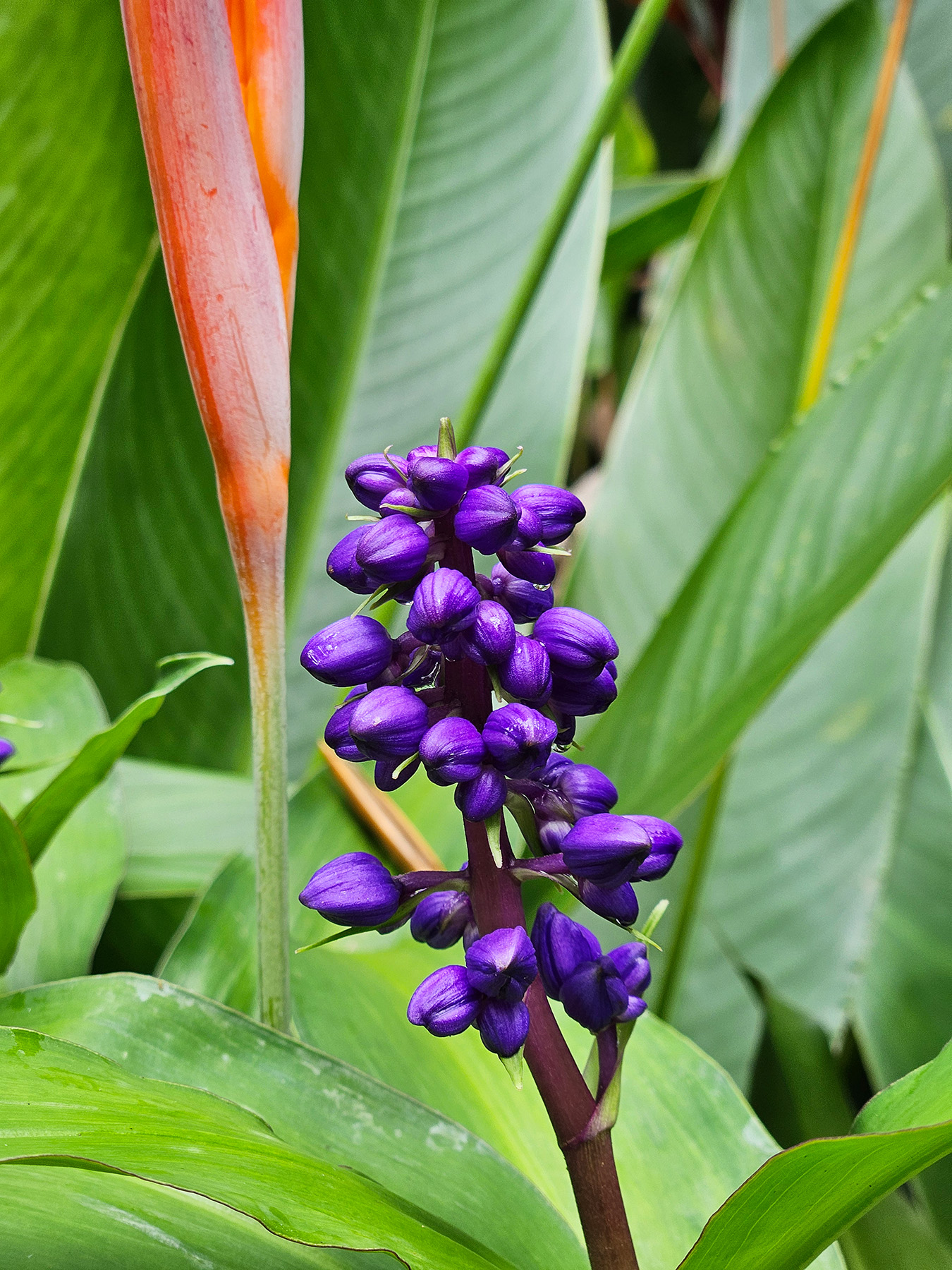
Dichorisandra thyrsiflora J.C.Mikan (Maui)

Dichorisandra thyrsiflora or blue ginger is a species of tropical flowering plant which resembles ginger in growth and habit, but is actually related to the spiderworts (the genus Tradescantia). The plant is native to the tropical woodlands of North, Central and South America, especially in Atlantic Forest vegetation in Brazil. Of the family Commelinaceae, it is cultivated for its handsome spotted stems and large shiny foliage which is held horizontally, surmounted by striking blue flowers.

It was first described by the naturalist Johann Christian Mikan in 1823.

D. thyrsiflora was first grown in England in 1822, and is recorded from Sir William MacArthur's catalogue in 1857 of plants he grew in Camden southwest of Sydney. It has become naturalised in a small region of northeastern New South Wales in Australia.

The Latin specific epithet thyrsiflora means "with flower clusters resembling thyme".

This plant has gained the Royal Horticultural Society's Award of Garden Merit.
