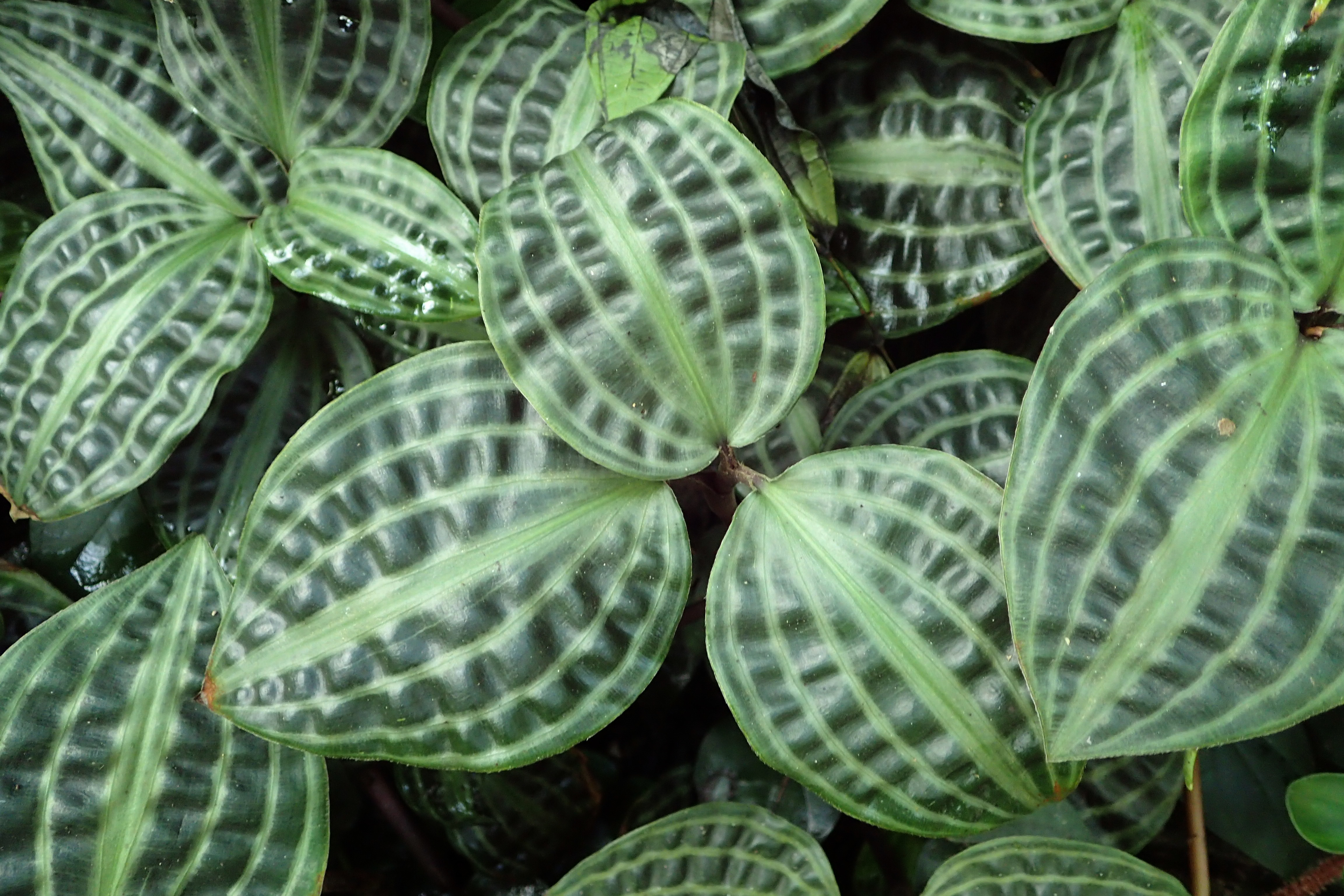
- Geogenanthus poeppigii at the Boltz Conservatory

Scientific classification
- Kingdom: Plantae
- Clade: Tracheophytes
- Clade: Angiosperms
- Clade: Monocots
- Clade: Commelinids
- Order: Commelinales
- Family: Commelinaceae
- Genus: Geogenanthus
- Species: G. poeppigii

Binomial name
- Geogenanthus poeppigii (Miq.)Faden

= Geogenanthus poeppigii =

Species of flowering plant

Geogenanthus poeppigii, commonly called the seersucker plant, is a flowering plant species in the family Commelinaceae (the dayflower & spiderwort family). As currently circumscribed, the genus Geogenanthus includes two other species, G. ciliatus and G. rhizanthus. This species is named after 19th century German naturalist Eduard Friedrich Poeppig. Geogenanthus undatus is an outdated synonym for G. poeppigii.

== Etymology ==
The specific epithet poeppigii is named after the man who first discovered this species, Eduard Friedrich Poeppig (1798-1868). This species got its common name, 'seersucker plant', because of its close resemblance to the puckering of seersucker fabric.

== Systematics ==
Geogenanthus poeppiggi belongs to the genus Geogenanthus of the flowering plant family Commelinaceae. Commelinaceae is a well defined family of 41 genera and about 650 species. G. poeppiggi is placed under the subtribe Dichorisandrinae, within the tribe Tradescantieae. Tradescantieae consists of 7 subtribes and the subtribe Dichorisandrinae consists of 5 new world genera and around 51 species. The 5 genera is divided into two monophyletic groups. Dichorisandra, Siderasis and Geogenanthus are one monophyletic group and the second group contains Cochliostema and Plowmanianthus. Dichorisandrinae subtribe displays a range of morphological and ecological variation within it. All members of the subtribe share a similar karyotype of 19 large chromosomes. The genus Geogenanthus is distinguished by a particular 6-celled stomatal complex and basal axillary inflorescences. An analysis of DNA sequences indicate Geogenanthus is closely related to the genus Plowmanianthus followed by Cochliostema. Roots of Geogenanthus are tuberous and they penetrate the soil, which makes the genus different from its close relatives. Analysis of morphological characters in Commelinaceae indicate Geogenanthus is closely related to Dichoriscantieae and Siderasis, but Geogenanthus is placed as the sister to Dichoriscantieae and Siderasis in the cladogram from the combined morphology and sequence analysis, with high bootstrap value supporting the placement.

Based on the estimates of origin and diversification of the order Commelinales, which might have been sometime during the mid to late cretaceous period i.e. between 123 and 66 million years ago, it can be very roughly estimated that the genus Geogenanthus could have originated 66 million years ago.

== Distribution ==
Native to Amazonia. It has been documented in the lowlands of Peru and western Brazil, and is typically found on the floor of primary rainforests.

== Morphology ==
The bottom of the leaf is purple and the top of its leaves are green with darker green stripes. The surface as a whole has a "puckered" appearance; hence the common name seersucker plant. This plant is particularly unique because its cymes rise from the lower nodes, which often looks like they're growing out of the ground. The three upper stamens are hairy and the three lower ones longer and smooth. Nodes and internodes are prominent on the stem. The stem of the plant is covered in minute brown hairs and, underground, plants possess a short, branching rhizome.

== Uses ==
This species is adaptable to a low light environments which has made it preferable for a house plant. It also likes humidity and, in a pot, it should not be allowed to dry out for too long.

== Horticulture ==
Bright, indirect sunlight is best. As with many related species, these plants do not flower or set seed freely, so stem cuttings are usually used to propagate this species.
