= List of Commelina species =

This is an alphabetically ordered list of Commelina species. The list includes all species accepted as of September 2014 by the World Checklist of Selected Plant Families.

== A ==
- Commelina acutispatha De Wild.
- Commelina acutissima Urb.
- Commelina africana L.
- Commelina agrostophylla F.Muell.
- Commelina albescens Hassk.
- Commelina albiflora Faden
- Commelina almandinaPellegrini
- Commelina amplexicaulis Hassk.
- Commelina appendiculata C.B.Clarke
- Commelina arenicola Faden
- Commelina ascendens J.K.Morton
- Commelina aspera G.Don ex Benth.
- Commelina attenuata K.D.Koenig ex Vahl
- Commelina aurantiiflora Faden & Raynsf.
- Commelina auriculata Blume
- Commelina avenifolia J.Graham

== B ==
- Commelina bambusifolia Matuda
- Commelina bambusifolioides Matuda
- Commelina bangii Rusby
- Commelina barbata Lam.
- Commelina beccariana Martelli
- Commelina bella Oberm.
- Commelina benghalensis L.
- Commelina bequaertii De Wild.
- Commelina boissieriana C.B.Clarke
- Commelina bracteosa Hassk.
- Commelina bravoa Matuda

== C ==
- Commelina cameroonensis J.K.Morton
- Commelina capitata Benth.
- Commelina caroliniana Walter
- Commelina chamissonis Klotzsch ex C.B.Clarke
- Commelina chayaensis Faden
- Commelina ciliata Stanley
- Commelina clarkeana K.Schum.
- Commelina clavata C.B.Clarke
- Commelina clavatoides Nampy & S.M.Joseph
- Commelina coelestis Willd.
- Commelina communis L.
- Commelina congesta C.B.Clarke
- Commelina congestipatha López-Ferr. & al.
- Commelina corbisieri De Wild.
- Commelina corradii Chiov. ex Chiarugi
- Commelina crassicaulis C.B.Clarke
- Commelina cufodontii Chiov.
- Commelina cyanea R.Br.

== D ==
- Commelina dammeriana K.Schum.
- Commelina deflexa Rusby
- Commelina dekindtiana Fritsch
- Commelina demissa C.B.Clarke
- Commelina dianthifolia Delile
- Commelina diffusa Burm.f.
- Commelina disperma Faden
- Commelina droogmansiana De Wild.

== E ==
- Commelina eckloniana Kunth
- Commelina elliptica Kunth in Humb. & al.
- Commelina ensifolia R.Br.
- Commelina erecta L.

== F ==
- Commelina fasciculata Ruiz & Pav.
- Commelina fluviatilis Brenan
- Commelina foliacea Chiov.
- Commelina forskaolii Vahl
- Commelina frutescens Faden

== G ==
- Commelina gambiae C.B.Clarke
- Commelina gelatinosa Edgew.
- Commelina geniculata Desv. ex Ham.
- Commelina giorgii De Wild.
- Commelina gourmaensis A.Chev.
- Commelina grandis Brenan
- Commelina grossa C.B.Clarke
- Commelina guaranitica C.B.Clarke ex Chodat & Hassl.

== H ==
- Commelina haitiensis Urb. & Ekman
- Commelina heterosperma Blatt. & Hallb.
- Commelina hispida Ruiz & Pav.
- Commelina hockii De Wild.
- Commelina holubii C.B.Clarke
- Commelina homblei De Wild.
- Commelina huillensis Welw. ex C.B.Clarke
- Commelina humblotii H.Perrier

== I ==
- Commelina imberbis Ehrenb. ex Hassk.
- Commelina indehiscens E.Barnes
- Commelina irumuensis De Wild.

== J ==
- Commelina jaliscana Matuda
- Commelina jamesonii C.B.Clarke

== K ==
- Commelina kapiriensis De Wild.
- Commelina kilanga De Wild.
- Commelina kisantuensis De Wild.
- Commelina kitaleensis Faden
- Commelina kituloensis Faden
- Commelina kotschyi Hassk.

== L ==
- Commelina lanceolata R.Br.
- Commelina latifolia Hochst. ex A.Rich.
- Commelina leiocarpa Benth.
- Commelina longicapsa C.B.Clarke
- Commelina longifolia Lam.
- Commelina loureiroi Kunth
- Commelina lukei Faden
- Commelina lukonzolwensis De Wild.
- Commelina luteiflora De Wild.
- Commelina luzonensis Elmer

== M ==
- Commelina macrospatha Gilg & Ledermann ex Mildbr.
- Commelina macrosperma J.K.Morton
- Commelina maculata Edgew.
- Commelina madagascarica C.B.Clarke
- Commelina major H.Perrier
- Commelina martyrum H.Lév.
- Commelina mascarenica C.B.Clarke
- Commelina mathewsii (C.B.Clarke) Faden & D.R.Hunt
- Commelina melanorrhiza Faden
- Commelina membranacea Robyns
- Commelina mensensis Schweinf.
- Commelina merkeri K.Schum.
- Commelina microspatha K.Schum.
- Commelina milne-redheadii Faden
- Commelina minor Y.N.Lee & Y.C.Oh
- Commelina modesta Oberm.
- Commelina montigena H.Perrier
- Commelina mwatayamvoana P.A.Duvign. & Dewit

== N ==
- Commelina neurophylla C.B.Clarke
- Commelina nigritana Benth.
- Commelina nivea López-Ferr. & al.
- Commelina nyasensis C.B.Clarke

== O ==
- Commelina obliqua Vahl
- Commelina oligotricha Miq.
- Commelina orchidophylla Faden & Layton

== P ==
- Commelina paleata Hassk. in Miq.
- Commelina pallida Willd.
- Commelina pallidispatha Faden
- Commelina paludosa Blume
- Commelina petersii Hassk.
- Commelina phaeochaeta Chiov.
- Commelina platyphylla Klotzsch ex Seub.
- Commelina polhillii Faden & M.H.Alford
- Commelina pseudopurpurea Faden
- Commelina pseudoscaposa De Wild.
- Commelina purpurea C.B.Clarke
- Commelina pycnospatha Brenan
- Commelina pynaertii De Wild.

== Q ==
- Commelina quarrei De Wild.
- Commelina queretarensis López-Ferr. & al.
- Commelina quitensis Benth.

== R ==
- Commelina ramosissima López-Ferr. & al.
- Commelina ramulosa (C.B.Clarke) H.Perrier
- Commelina reptans Brenan
- Commelina reticulata Stanley
- Commelina reygaertii De Wild.
- Commelina rhodesica Norl.
- Commelina robynsii De Wild.
- Commelina rogersii Burtt Davy
- Commelina rosulata Faden & Layton
- Commelina ruandensis De Wild.
- Commelina rufipes Seub. in Mart. & al.
- Commelina rupicola Font Quer ex Emb. & Maire in Jahand. & al.
- Commelina rzedowskii López-Ferr. & al.

== S ==
- Commelina sp. sandstone
- Commelina saxatilis H.Perrier
- Commelina saxosa De Wild.
- Commelina scabra Benth.
- Commelina scandens Welw. ex C.B.Clarke
- Commelina scaposa C.B.Clarke
- Commelina schinzii C.B.Clarke in T.Durand & Schinz
- Commelina schliebenii Mildbr.
- Commelina schomburgkiana Klotzsch in R.H.Schomb.
- Commelina schweinfurthii C.B.Clarke
- Commelina shinsendaensis De Wild.
- Commelina sikkimensis C.B.Clarke
- Commelina singularis Vell.
- Commelina socorrogonzaleziae Espejo & López-Ferr.
- Commelina somalensis Chiov.
- Commelina spectabilis C.B.Clarke
- Commelina sphaerorrhizoma Faden & Layton
- Commelina standleyi Steyerm.
- Commelina stefaniniana Chiov.
- Commelina subcucullata C.B.Clarke
- Commelina subscabrifolia De Wild.
- Commelina subulata Roth
- Commelina suffruticosa Blume
- Commelina sugariae Pellegrini
- Commelina sulcatisperma Faden
- Commelina sylvatica De Wild.

== T ==
- Commelina texcocana Matuda
- Commelina trachysperma Chiov.
- Commelina transversifolia De Wild.
- Commelina triangulispatha Mildbr.
- Commelina tricarinata Stanley
- Commelina tricolor E.Barnes
- Commelina trilobosperma K.Schum.
- Commelina tuberosa L.

== U ==
- Commelina umbellata Schumach. & Thonn.
- Commelina undulata R.Br.
- Commelina ussilensis Schweinf.

== V ==
- Commelina velutina Mildbr.
- Commelina vermoesenii De Wild.
- Commelina vilavelhensis Corrêa da Maia, Cervi & Tardivo
- Commelina villosa C.B.Clarke
- Commelina virginica L.

== W ==
- Commelina welwitschii C.B.Clarke
- Commelina wightii Raizada

== Z ==
- Commelina zambesica C.B.Clarke
- Commelina zenkeri C.B.Clarke
- Commelina zeylanica Falkenb.
- Commelina zigzag P.A.Duvign. & Dewit
