= Bulbophyllum sect. Oreonastes =

- Bulbophyllum teretifolium

Scientific classification
- Kingdom: Plantae
- Clade: Tracheophytes
- Clade: Angiosperms
- Clade: Monocots
- Order: Asparagales
- Family: Orchidaceae
- Subfamily: Epidendroideae
- Genus: Bulbophyllum
- Section: Bulbophyllum sect. Oreonastes; G.A. Fischer & J.J. Verm. ex J.J. Verm. 2014

Type species
- Bulbophyllum oreonastes

Species
- See text

Section of flowering plants

Bulbophyllum sect. Oreonastes is a section of the genus Bulbophyllum.

== Description ==
Species in this section has rhizomes and pseudobulbs with two leaves

== Distribution ==
Plants from this section are found in African lowland forest.

== Species ==
Bulbophyllum section Oreonastes comprises the following species:

Image	Name	Distribution	Elevation (m)
	Bulbophyllum acutibracteatum De Wild.1921	Liberia, Sierra Leone, Cameroon, Equatorial Guinea, Gabon, Gulf of Guinea Islands and Zaire	650–2,300 metres (2,130–7,550 ft)
	Bulbophyllum concatenatum P.J.Cribb & P.Taylor 1980	Tanzania	0–500 metres (0–1,640 ft)
	Bulbophyllum encephalodes Summerh. 1951	Nigeria, Burundi, Cameroon, Rwanda, Zaire, Kenya, Tanzania, Uganda, Malawi, Zambia and Zimbabwe	800–1,500 metres (2,600–4,900 ft)
	Bulbophyllum fuscum Lindl. 1839	Guinea, Ivory Coast, Liberia, Nigeria, Sierra Leone, Central African Republic, Cameroon, Equatorial Guinea, Congo, Gabon, Rwanda, Zaire, Kenya, Tanzania, Angola, Malawi, Mozambique, Zambia and Zimbabwe	1,100–1,500 metres (3,600–4,900 ft)
	Bulbophyllum horridulum J.J.Verm. 1986	Zaire	1,000 metres (3,300 ft)
	Bulbophyllum lupulinum Lindl. 1862	Guinea, Ivory Coast, Nigeria, Sierra Leone, Togo, Congo, Zaire, Ethiopia Zambia	1,400–2,000 metres (4,600–6,600 ft)
	Bulbophyllum oreonastes Rchb.f. 1881	Ghana, Guinea, Ivory Coast, Liberia, Nigeria, Sierra Leone, Central African Republic, Cameroons, Equatorial Guinea, Gabon, The Gulf Of Guinea Islands, Rwanda, Zaire, Tanzania, Uganda, Angola, Zambia and Malawi	800–1,500 metres (2,600–4,900 ft)
	Bulbophyllum oxychilum Schltr. 1905	Ghana, Ivory Coast, Liberia, Nigeria, Central African Republic, Gabon, Zaire and Uganda	600–2,100 metres (2,000–6,900 ft)
	Bulbophyllum teretifolium Schltr. 1905	Cameroon	1,400 metres (4,600 ft)
	Bulbophyllum unifoliatum De Wild. 1921	Rwanda, Zaire, Tanzania, Angola, Malawi, Mozambique, Zambia and Zimbabwe	1,000–1,700 metres (3,300–5,600 ft)
