= C. clavata =

C. clavata may refer to:

- Coilostylis clavata, an orchid species
- Cellypha clavata, a fungus species in the genus Cellypha
- Commelina clavata, a flowering plant species in the genus Commelina
- Clavus clavata, a sea snail species
- Curvularia clavata, a mold species in the genus Curvularia
- Cunninghamella clavata, a soil fungus species
