= Commelina acutispatha =

Scientific classification
- Kingdom: Plantae
- Clade: Tracheophytes
- Clade: Angiosperms
- Clade: Monocots
- Clade: Commelinids
- Order: Commelinales
- Family: Commelinaceae
- Genus: Commelina
- Species: C. acutispatha

Binomial name
- Commelina acutispatha De Wild., 1931

Synonyms
- Commelina thomasii Hutch.

Species of flowering plant

Commelina acutispatha is an herbaceous plant in the dayflower family found primarily in East and Central Africa, including limited distribution in the African Great Lakes country of Uganda. In addition to that country, it is known from Sierra Leone, Liberia, Ghana, Togo, Nigeria, Cameroon, Gabon, and the Democratic Republic of the Congo. It is a common species in regions of West Africa with significant forest cover, where it is often weedy. It is most common in disturbed, moist soils, in which it scrambles over other plants. The name Commelina thomasii was often used for West African plants until it was realized that Commelina acutispatha, an older name originally applied to plants from the Democratic Republic of the Congo, was the same species. The petals range in color from white to pale lilac to violet; the lower petal is about half as large as the upper paired petals. The central anther is reported to have a blue patch on the connective. It has solitary spathes borne on a peduncle covered in hook-hairs.
