= Disa katangensis =

Conservation status
- Data Deficient (IUCN 3.1)

Scientific classification
- Kingdom: Plantae
- Clade: Tracheophytes
- Clade: Angiosperms
- Clade: Monocots
- Order: Asparagales
- Family: Orchidaceae
- Subfamily: Orchidoideae
- Genus: Disa
- Species: D. katangensis

Binomial name
- Disa katangensis De Wild.

Synonyms
- Disa erubescens var. katangensis (De Wild.) Geerinck

Species of flowering plant

Disa katangensis is a perennial plant and geophyte belonging to the genus Disa. The plant is native to Angola, the Democratic Republic of the Congo, and Zambia.
