= Commelina hockii =

Scientific classification
- Kingdom: Plantae
- Clade: Tracheophytes
- Clade: Angiosperms
- Clade: Monocots
- Clade: Commelinids
- Order: Commelinales
- Family: Commelinaceae
- Genus: Commelina
- Species: C. hockii

Binomial name
- Commelina hockii De Wild., 1930

Species of flowering plant

Commelina hockii is an herbaceous plant in the dayflower family found primarily in Central Africa, from southwestern Tanzania in the east, west through the Democratic Republic of the Congo and Zambia, and possibly extending further west to Angola. The species' distinctive features include its long, tapering spathes with unfused margins, its white flowers, and its many-flowered lower cymes. It can be found in grasslands and Brachystegia-dominated woodland. It is fairly unusual among Commelina species in having variation in the color of the antherodes (i.e. non-functional anthers), with some individuals having entirely yellow antherodes, while others contain a dark spot in the center. Also, it is one of the only Commelina species known to leave a papery residue of dried fluid inside its spathes; normally only fused-spathe species are known to produce this substance. Only one specimen from Angola resembles this species, but it has blue flowers, suggesting it may be a poorly understood and as-yet undescribed separate species. Commelina hockii is probably closely related to Commelina kituloensis, which shares a similar fruit type, the same tufted perennial habit, similar large spathes with dried fluid substance, and equally numerously flowered inflorescences. That species differs in having purplish flowers, hairy leaves, shorter spathes, and a preference for high altitude grassland.
