= Rat's ears =

Rat's ears may refer to:

- Commelina forskaolii, a flowering plant species
- Auricularia cornea, an edible species of fungus, which in the Philippines is commonly referred to as taingang daga (rat's ears)
