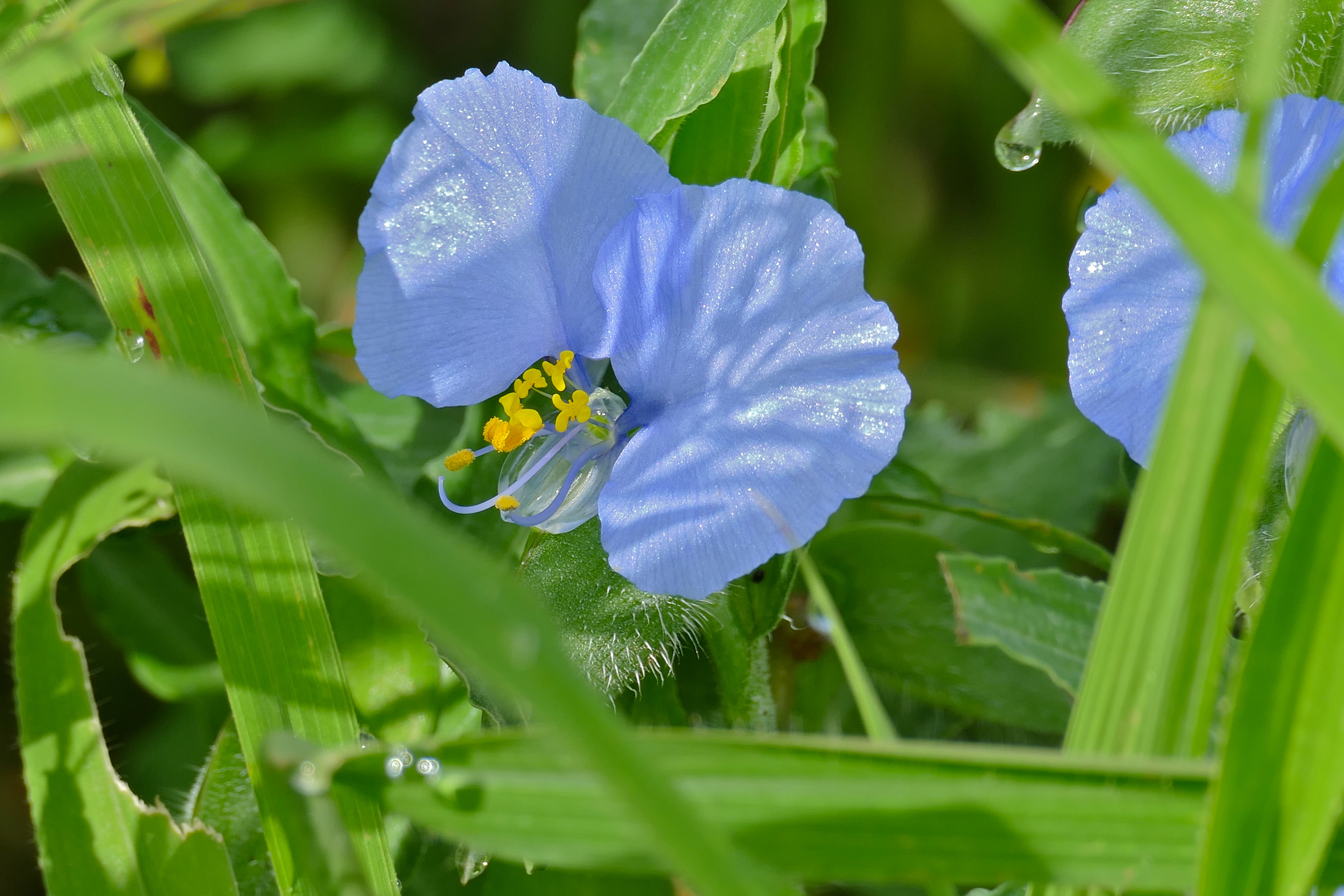

Scientific classification
- Kingdom: Plantae
- Clade: Tracheophytes
- Clade: Angiosperms
- Clade: Monocots
- Clade: Commelinids
- Order: Commelinales
- Family: Commelinaceae
- Genus: Commelina
- Species: C. eckloniana

Binomial name
- Commelina eckloniana Kunth, 1843

Synonyms
- Commelina claessensii De Wild.; Commelina critica De Wild.; Commelina echinosperma K.Schum.; Commelina echinulata Lebrun & Taton; Commelina nairobiensis Faden

= Commelina eckloniana =

Species of flowering plant

Commelina eckloniana is an herbaceous plant in the dayflower family with a broad distribution in Central and East Africa.

It ranges from Ethiopia, Kenya, and Tanzania in the east, west through Uganda, Burundi, Rwanda, and Malawi, into the Democratic Republic of the Congo and Zambia. It is considered one of the most diverse species in Africa. Its distinctive characteristics include a fused spathe with sparse hairs, blue flowers with bilocular ovaries, and nearly square fruits containing four seeds that are roughly spherical. It currently contains five subspecies, and at times has been split into five separate species that mostly correspond to the currently recognised subspecies. However, some of the subspecies may be functioning as species, and further study is needed to resolve the question of species limits in this group.

Subspecies

1. Commelina eckloniana subsp. claessensii (De Wild.) Faden - Democratic Republic of the Congo, Uganda
2. Commelina eckloniana subsp. critica (De Wild.) Faden - Democratic Republic of the Congo, Tanzania, Zambia, Malawi
3. Commelina eckloniana subsp. echinosperma (K.Schum.) Faden - Democratic Republic of the Congo, Tanzania, Zambia, Rwanda, Burundi, Kenya, Uganda, Ethiopia
4. Commelina eckloniana subsp. eckloniana - Zimbabwe, South Africa, Eswatini
5. Commelina eckloniana subsp. nairobiensis (Faden) Faden - Kenya
6. Commelina eckloniana subsp. thikaensis Faden - Kenya
