= C. caroliniana =

C. caroliniana may refer to:

- Cassia caroliniana, a synonym for Senna occidentalis, the coffee senna, a pantropical plant species
- Commelina caroliniana, the Carolina dayflower, a plant species
- Carpinus caroliniana, the American hornbeam, a small hardwood tree
