= Scurvy weed =

Scurvy weed is a common name for several flowering plants and may refer to:

- Commelina cyanea, native to Australia
- Commelina ensifolia, native to Australia, India, and Sri Lanka
- Tradescantia albiflora, native to South America
