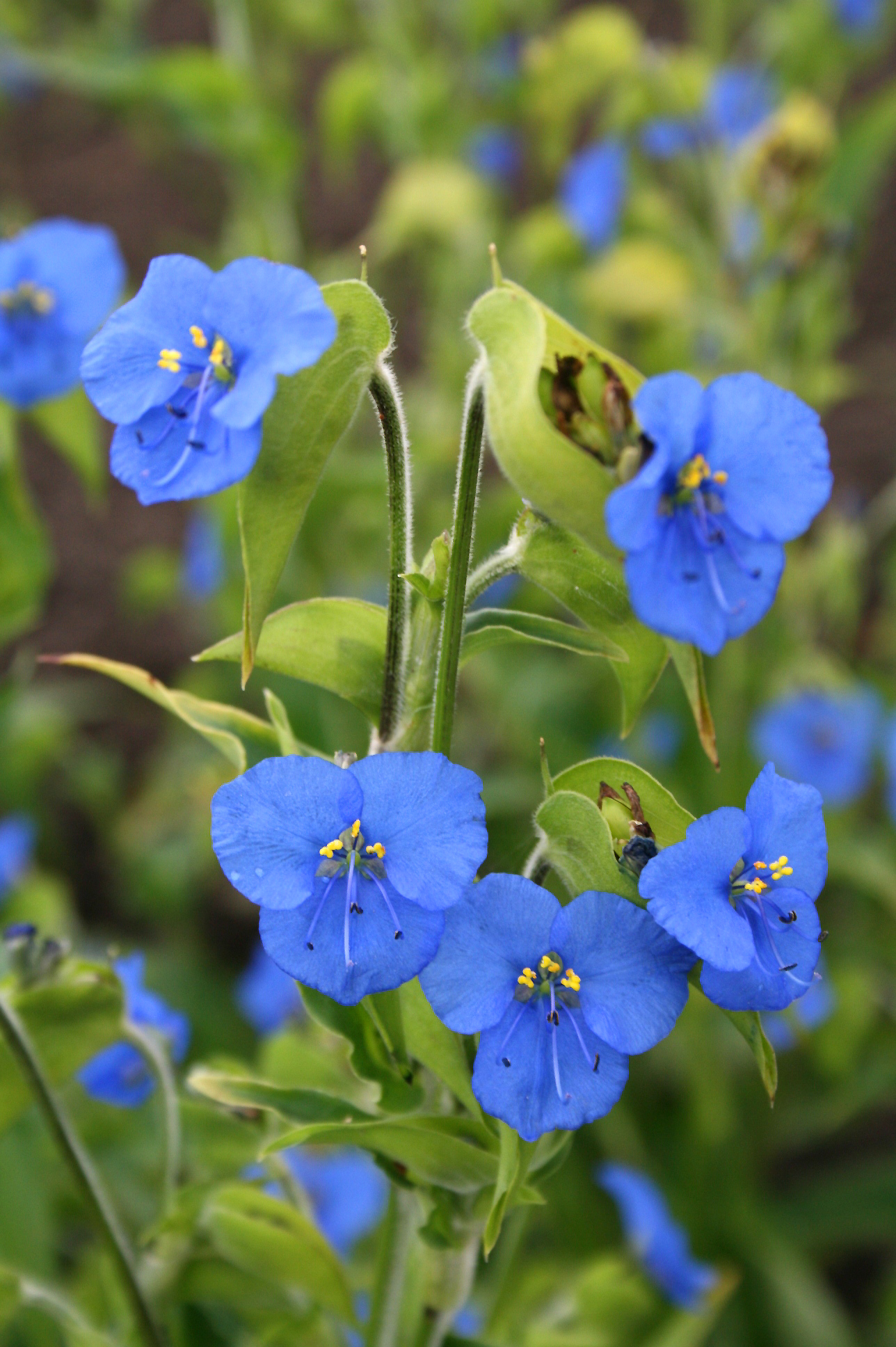

Scientific classification
- Kingdom: Plantae
- Clade: Tracheophytes
- Clade: Angiosperms
- Clade: Monocots
- Clade: Commelinids
- Order: Commelinales
- Family: Commelinaceae
- Genus: Commelina
- Species: C. tuberosa

Binomial name
- Commelina tuberosa L., 1753

= Commelina tuberosa =

Species of flowering plant

Commelina tuberosa is an herbaceous perennial plant in the dayflower family which is native to Mexico but grown worldwide as an ornamental plant. It is characterized by its purple-splotched spathes with free margins, its bright blue petals of equal size, its tuberous roots, and its four to ten flowered lower cymes. In the wild, it is encountered in moist fields, open forests, or pine-oak forests. The species is sometimes considered to include the species Commelina coelestis, Commelina dianthifolia, and Commelina elliptica, such as in the Flora Mesoamericana. When these are treated as separate, they are often referred to as the "Commelina tuberosa complex". Horticulturally, the species are often treated as separate entities because of their differing habits and leaf shapes. In this sense, Commelina tuberosa is a low-growing plant with long narrow leaves.

The Coelestis Group is a cultivar group of Commelina tuberosa which is grown ornamentally. Growing to 50 cm (20 in) tall by 100 cm (39 in) broad, it flowers in summer and autumn. Being a warm temperate plant which dislikes temperatures below −5 °C (23 °F), in cooler areas it must be lifted and stored in the winter months. It prefers a sunny or partially shaded sheltered spot in the garden.
