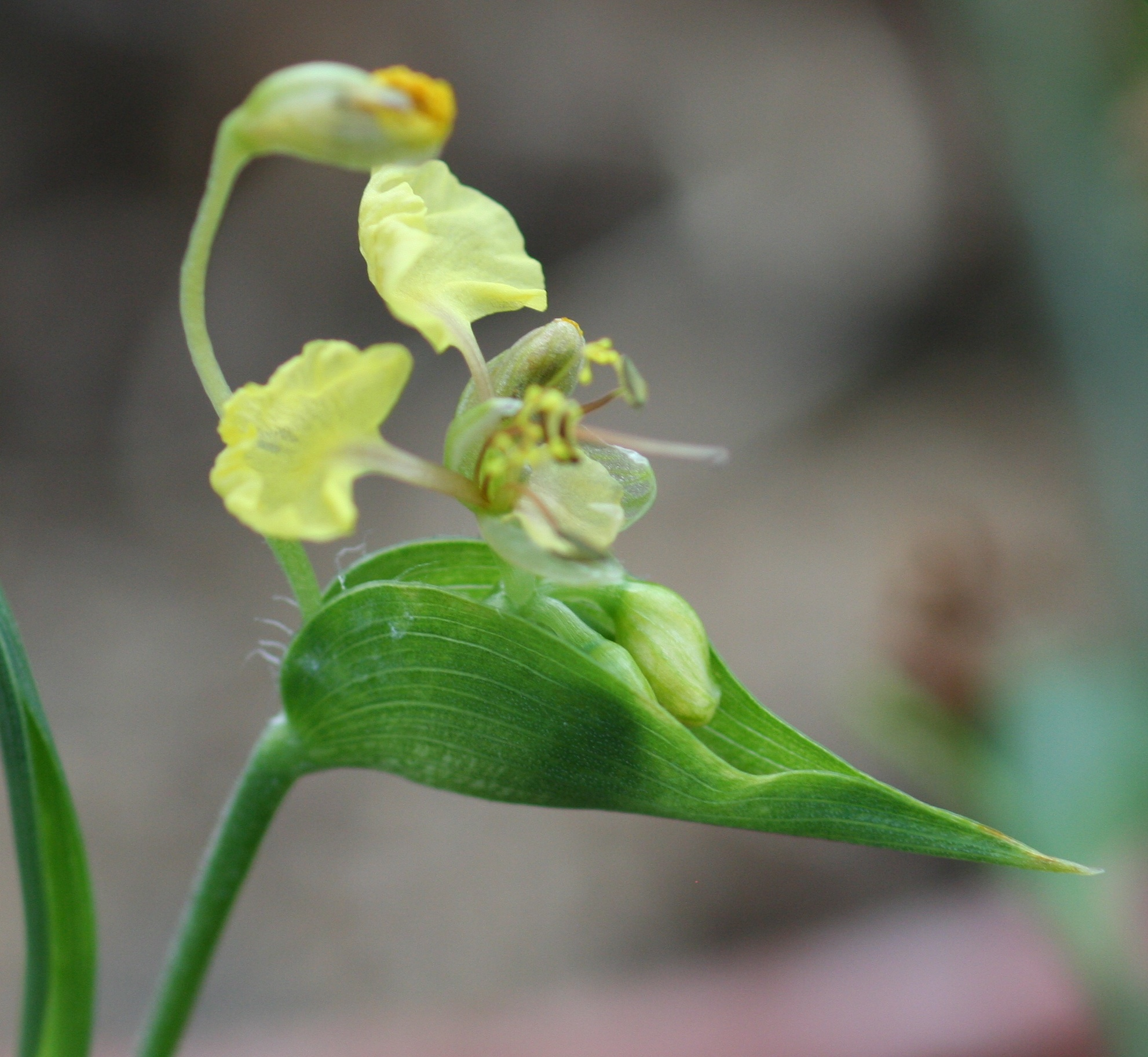
- Commelina welwitschii from Zimbabwe showing spathe and inflorescence

Scientific classification
- Kingdom: Plantae
- Clade: Tracheophytes
- Clade: Angiosperms
- Clade: Monocots
- Clade: Commelinids
- Order: Commelinales
- Family: Commelinaceae
- Genus: Commelina
- Species: C. welwitschii

Binomial name
- Commelina welwitschii C.B. Clarke

= Commelina welwitschii =

Species of flowering plant

Commelina welwitschii is an herbaceous plant in the dayflower family found in Southern Africa from Zimbabwe to Angola. A phylogenetic study based on the nuclear ribosomal DNA region 5S NTS and the chloroplast region trnL-trnF, two commonly used gene regions for determining relationships, revealed that Commelina welwitschii forms a clade with Commelina purpurea and Commelina fluviatilis. Both of these relatives are African, share an unusual leaf anatomy, and have linear leaves that are often folded. Although it has yellow flowers, this study did not find a close relationship with Commelina capitata or Commelina africana, the two other African yellow-flowered species. Robert Faden, an expert on the Commelinaceae, points out that Commelina welwitschii is one of only three species in the genus to have bead-like rhizomes along with Commelina crassicaulis and Commelina sphaerorrhizoma. While it is clear that the former species is most likely a close relative given its many other similarities, the latter species is unlikely closely related given major differences in other characters.
