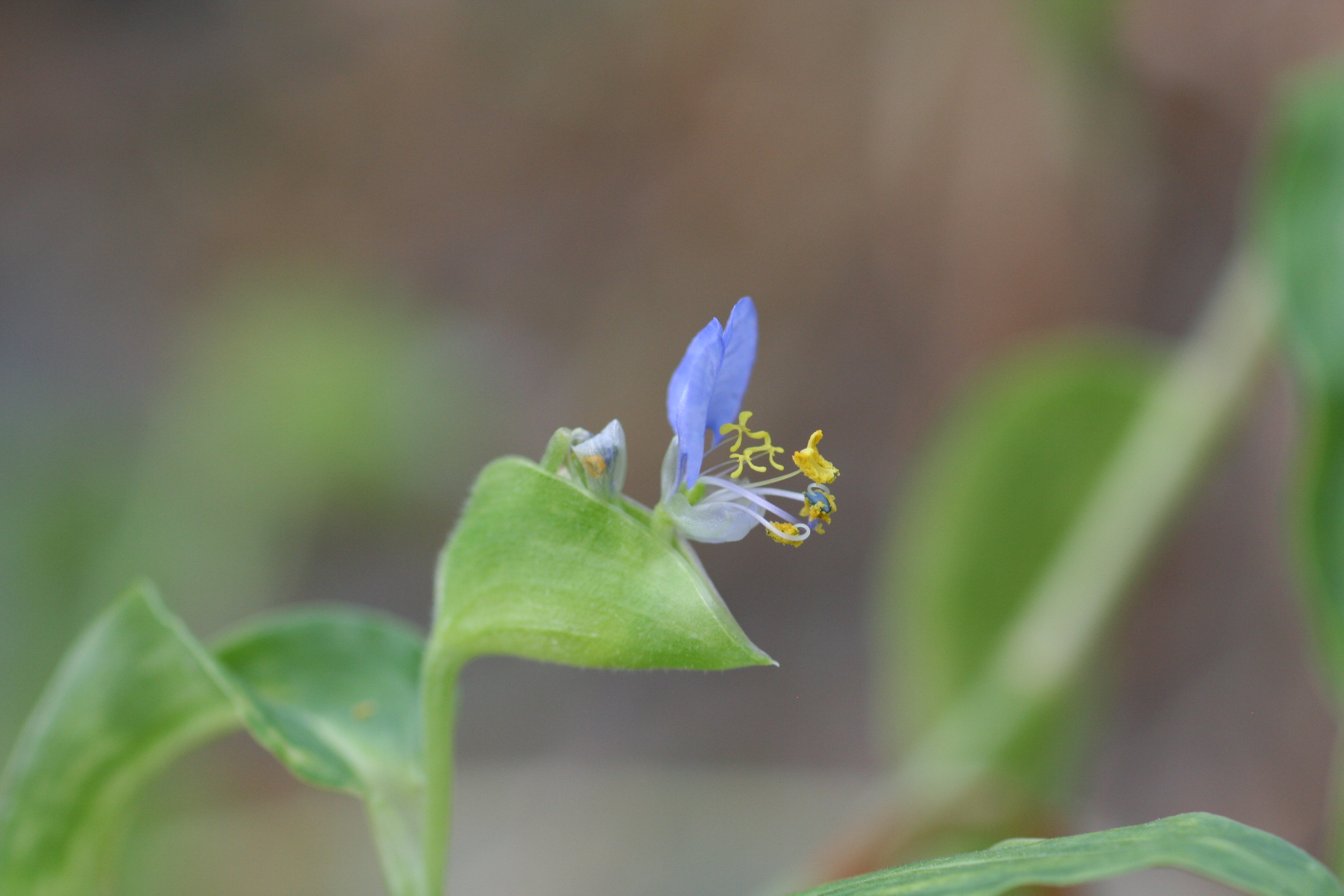
- Commelina mascarenica inflorescence and flower; plant collected in Somalia, but growing in a greenhouse

Scientific classification
- Kingdom: Plantae
- Clade: Tracheophytes
- Clade: Angiosperms
- Clade: Monocots
- Clade: Commelinids
- Order: Commelinales
- Family: Commelinaceae
- Genus: Commelina
- Species: C. mascarenica

Binomial name
- Commelina mascarenica C.B.Clarke

= Commelina mascarenica =

Species of flowering plant

Commelina mascarenica is a monocotyledonous, herbaceous plant in the dayflower family from East Africa. This pale blue-flowered herb is found in a variety of open habitats from open bush to roadsides. Although the species was originally thought to be restricted to Madagascar and the Comoro Islands, further study revealed that the species is also widely distributed along the East African coast from Somalia south to Mozambique. It had formerly been confused with the closely related species Commelina imberbis and Commelina lukei, the latter occurring alongside C. mascarenica throughout much of its range.
