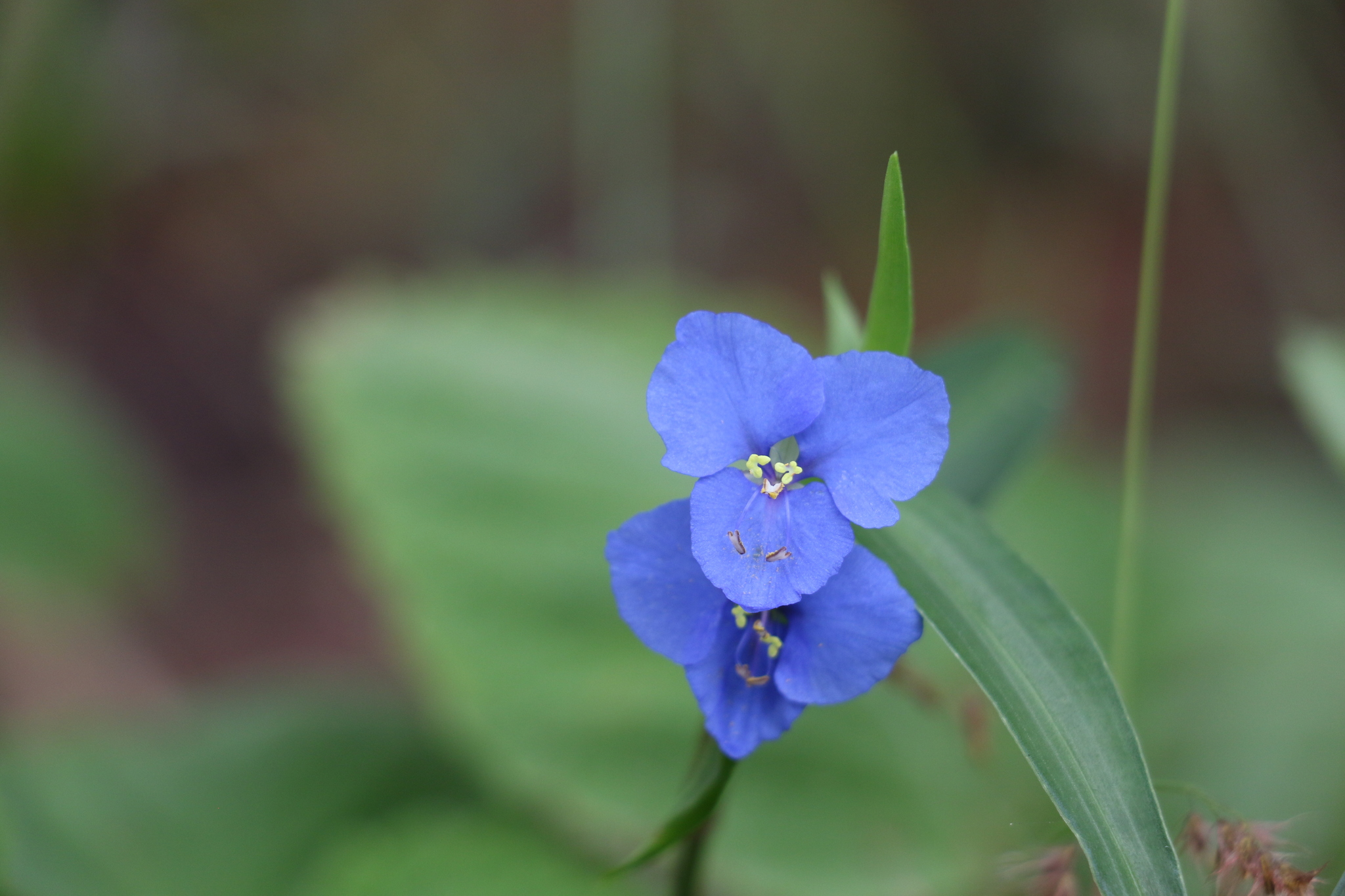

Conservation status
- Least Concern (NCA)

Scientific classification
- Kingdom: Plantae
- Clade: Tracheophytes
- Clade: Angiosperms
- Clade: Monocots
- Clade: Commelinids
- Order: Commelinales
- Family: Commelinaceae
- Genus: Commelina
- Species: C. lanceolata

Binomial name
- Commelina lanceolata R.Br.

= Commelina lanceolata =

Species of flowering plant

Commelina lanceolata is a plant in the family Commelinaceae native to Western Australia, the Northern Territory, Queensland and New South Wales in Australia.

It is a scrambling perennial herb first described by the Scottish botanist Robert Brown in 1810, who published his description in his work Prodromus Florae Novae Hollandiae et Insulae Van Diemen.

It is common on floodplains, growing when floodwaters have receded, and along watercourses, sometimes being found in shallow water.

== Conservation ==
This species is listed by the Queensland Department of Environment and Science as least concern. As of 30 March 2023, it has not been assessed by the International Union for Conservation of Nature (IUCN).

== Gallery ==
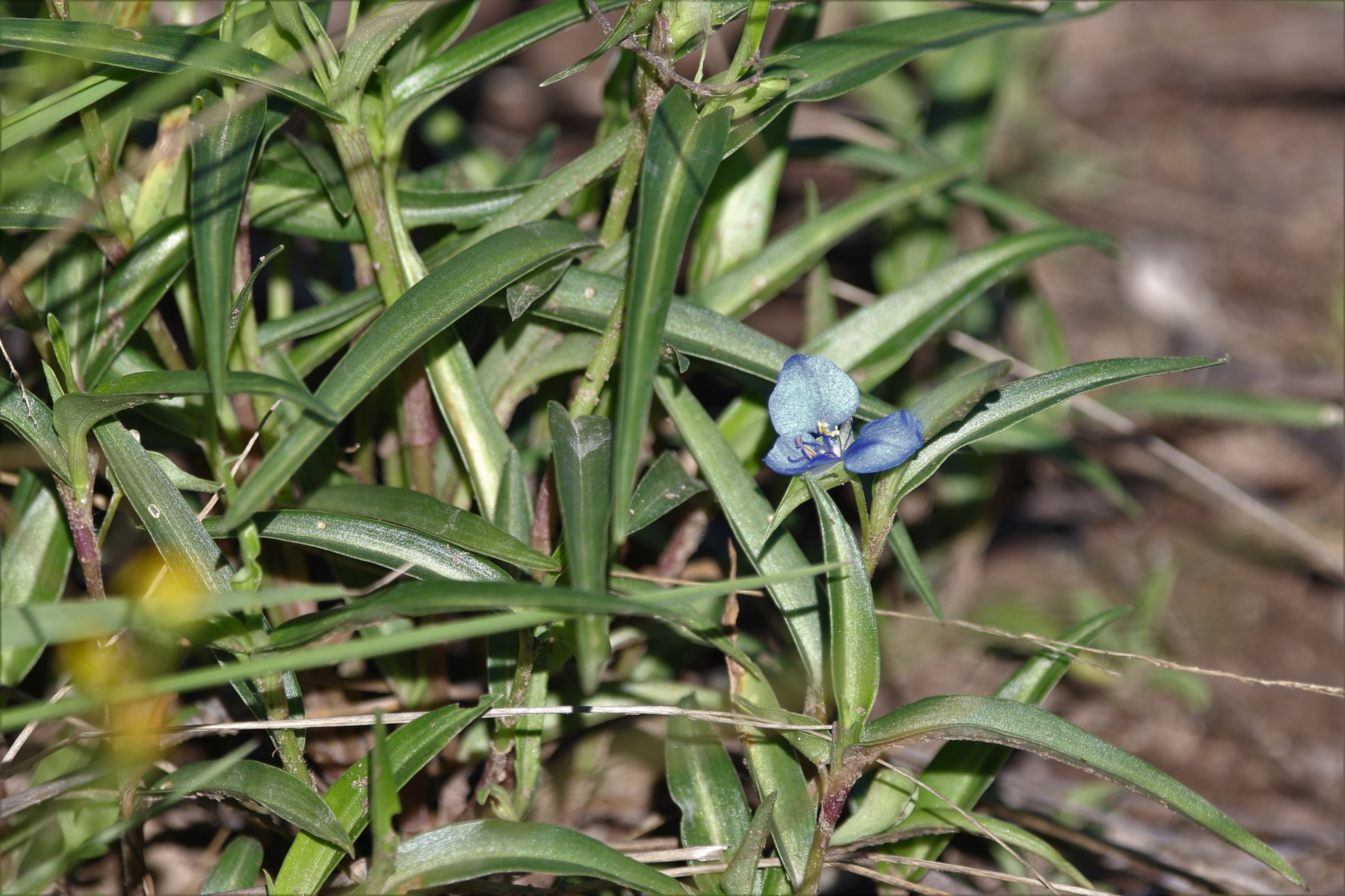

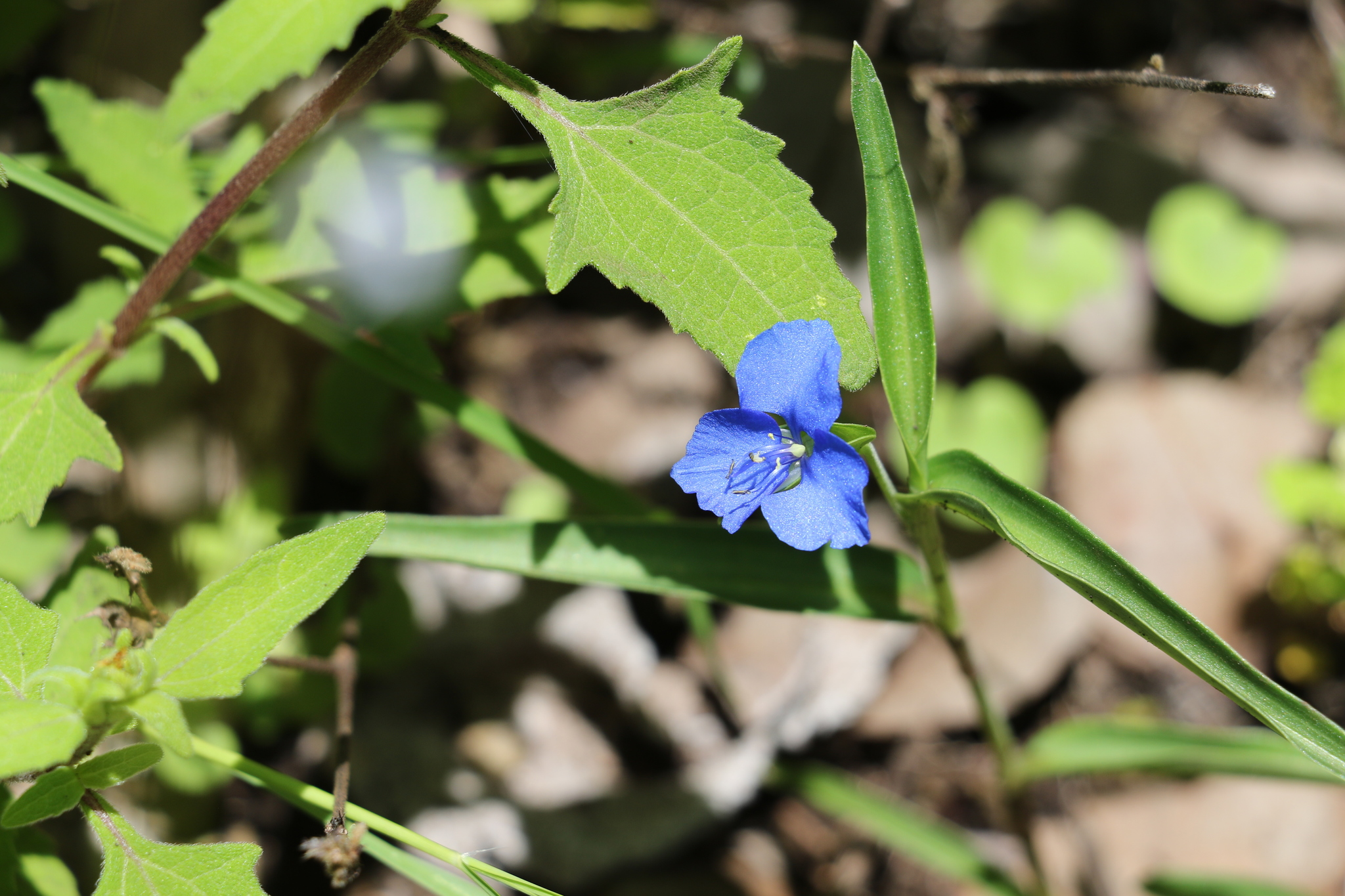

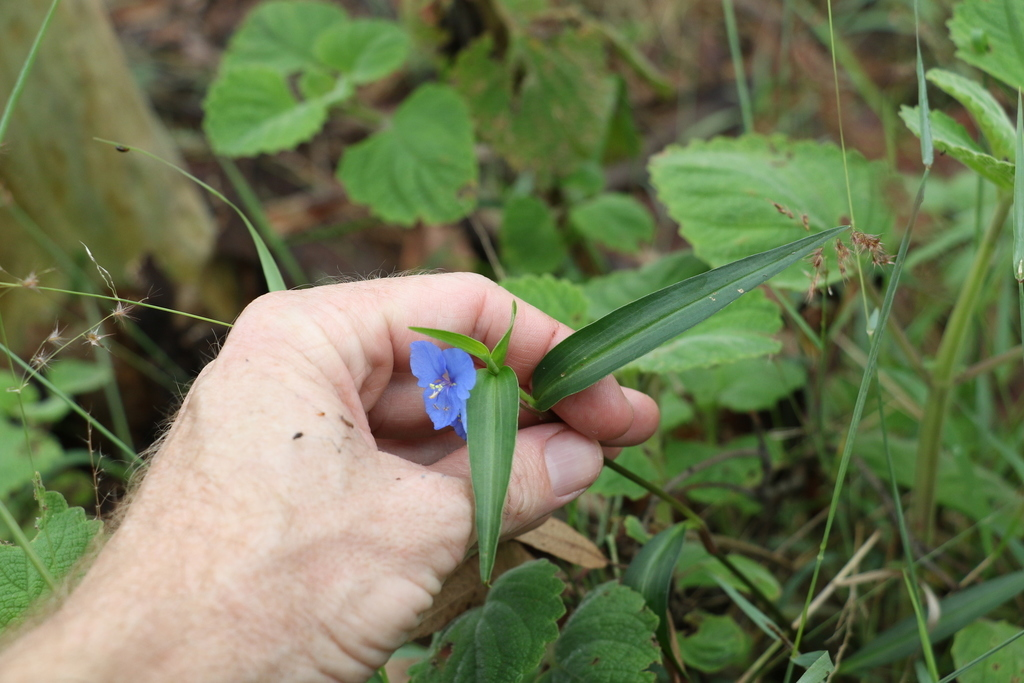

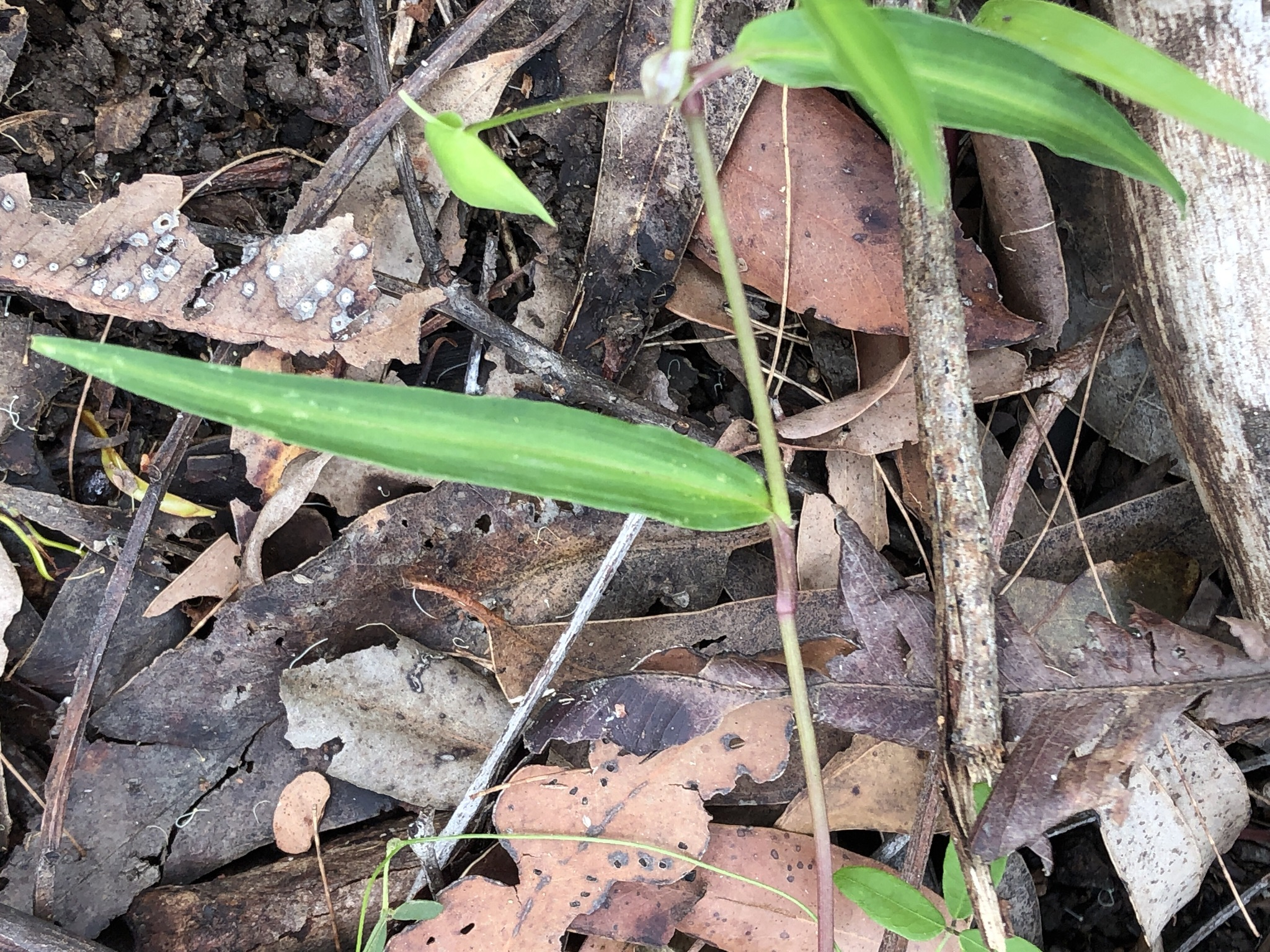
