= Commelina grossa =

Scientific classification
- Kingdom: Plantae
- Clade: Tracheophytes
- Clade: Angiosperms
- Clade: Monocots
- Clade: Commelinids
- Order: Commelinales
- Family: Commelinaceae
- Genus: Commelina
- Species: C. grossa

Binomial name
- Commelina grossa C.B.Clarke, 1901

Species of flowering plant

Commelina grossa is an herbaceous plant in the dayflower family found in the East and Southern African countries of Tanzania, Malawi, and Zambia. The species is easily recognised by its mainly basal leaves which are long and linear, and its spathes, which lack hairs and are quite large. The petals are mauve-blue with the lower petal being highly reduced and the sepals fused into a cup. These features suggest it may be related to Commelina schweinfurthii and its allies, which share many of the same floral characters. The species' typical habitat is in woodland on sandy soil or soils that become seasonally waterlogged. Flowering occurs in April and June.
