= Commelina zenkeri =

Scientific classification
- Kingdom: Plantae
- Clade: Tracheophytes
- Clade: Angiosperms
- Clade: Monocots
- Clade: Commelinids
- Order: Commelinales
- Family: Commelinaceae
- Genus: Commelina
- Species: C. zenkeri

Binomial name
- Commelina zenkeri C.B.Clarke

Species of flowering plant

Commelina zenkeri is a plant species native to tropical Africa. It is known from Uganda and Cameroon. Unconfirmed reports place it in Democratic Republic of the Congo as well. It grows on rocky hillsides in evergreen tropical forests at elevations up to 1300 m.

Commelina zenkeri is a perennial herb up to 40 cm tall. Shoots erect or decumbent, branching, rooting at the nodes. Flowering shoots ascending, unbranched. Leaves lanceolate, up to 11 cm long. Spathes are terminal, solitary or in pairs. Flowers are up to 2 cm across, blue, lavender or white, some hermaphroditic, others staminate. Capsules have 2 locules, each with 1 seed.
