= Commelina fasciculata =

Scientific classification
- Kingdom: Plantae
- Clade: Tracheophytes
- Clade: Angiosperms
- Clade: Monocots
- Clade: Commelinids
- Order: Commelinales
- Family: Commelinaceae
- Genus: Commelina
- Species: C. fasciculata

Binomial name
- Commelina fasciculata Ruiz & Pav.

Synonyms
- Commelina glabra Baker; Commelina gracilis Hook.; Commelina hispida Ruiz & Pav.; Commelina hispida var. gaudichaudii C.B.Clarke; Commelina nervosa Ruiz & Pav.; Commelina schoubertii Zucc. ex Ten.; Ovidia gracilis Raf.

Species of plant

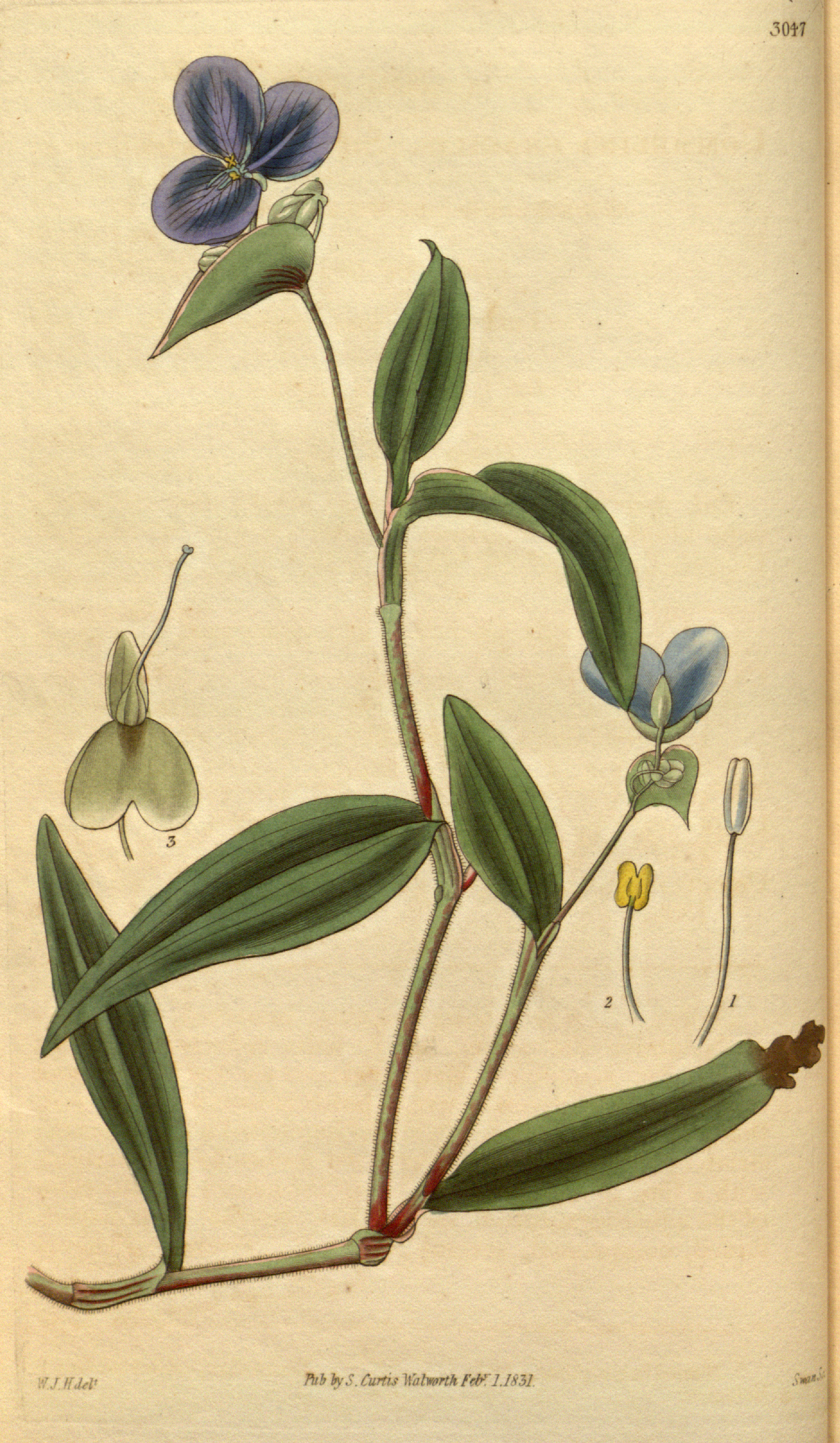

Comellina fasciculata is a species of herbaceous tropical plant in to the family Commelinaceae. It is native to Bolivia and Peru and was described by Ruiz and Pavon in 1798. It has a high chromosome number (2n= 180), one of the highest numbers among the Monocots.
