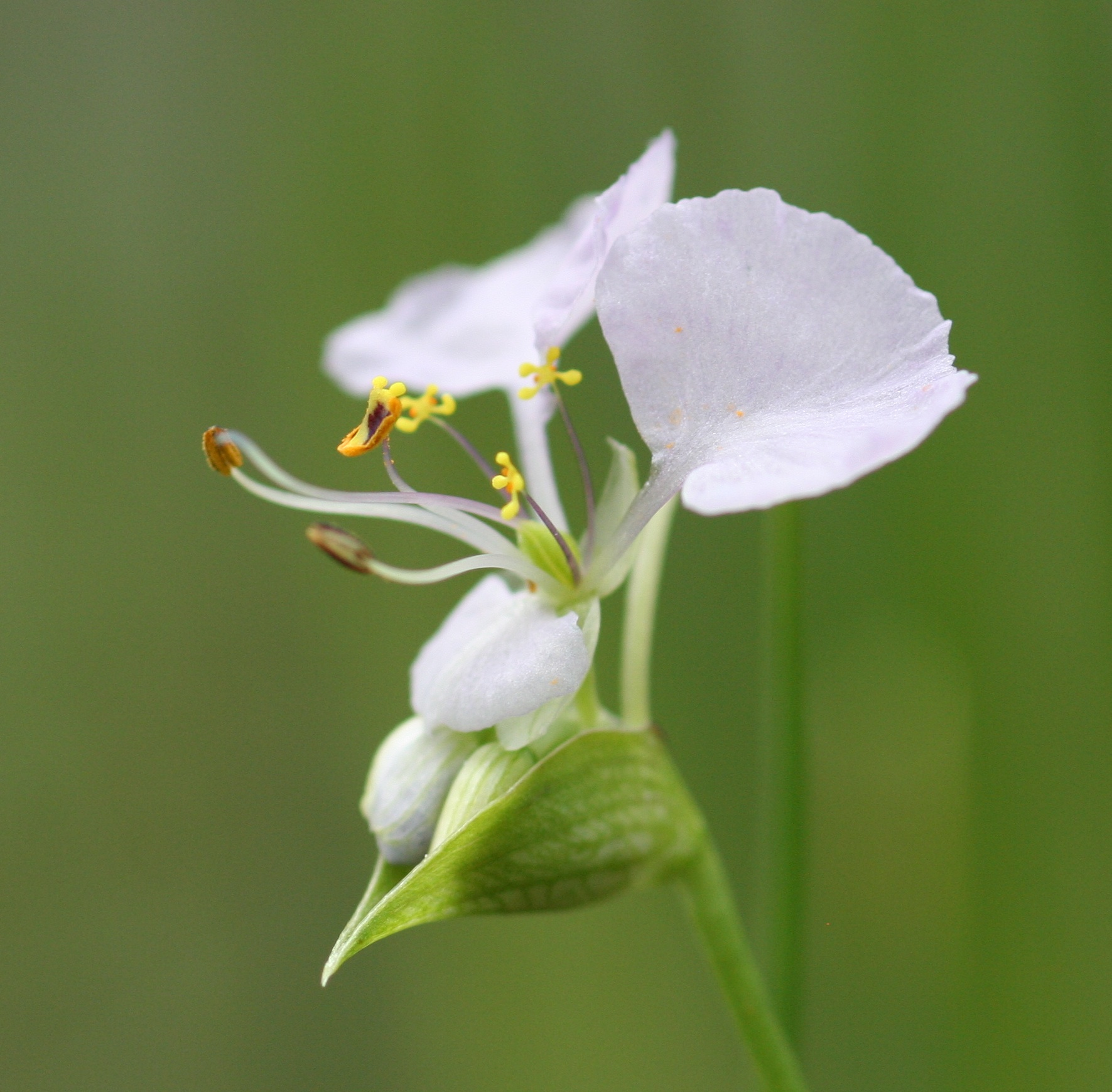
- Commelina fluviatilis from Chaya Lake in Tanzania showing spathe and inflorescence

Scientific classification
- Kingdom: Plantae
- Clade: Tracheophytes
- Clade: Angiosperms
- Clade: Monocots
- Clade: Commelinids
- Order: Commelinales
- Family: Commelinaceae
- Genus: Commelina
- Species: C. fluviatilis

Binomial name
- Commelina fluviatilis Brenan

= Commelina fluviatilis =

Species of aquatic plant

Commelina fluviatilis is an herbaceous plant in the dayflower family found primarily in Central Africa. It is known from Tanzania, the Democratic Republic of the Congo, Zambia, and the Caprivi Strip region of Namibia.

It is one of the most distinctive members of its genus because of its semi-aquatic habitat preference, its floating stems, its long and narrow leaves that are folded in on themselves, and its many-flowered lower cincinnus, just to name a few characters. The species has tuberous roots set in the soil which allow it to withstand periods of severe drought despite its preference for water. It can grow in over a half meter of water, typically in marshes, swamps, rivers, or lake shores. Like many members of the genus, it cannot self-pollinate, and furthermore has a tendency for its ovules to abort, leading to fruits with few seeds.

A phylogenetic study based on the nuclear ribosomal DNA region 5S NTS and the chloroplast region trnL-trnF, two commonly used gene regions for determining relationships, revealed that Commelina fluviatilis forms a clade with Commelina purpurea and Commelina welwitschii. Both of these relatives are African, share an unusual leaf anatomy, and have linear leaves that are often folded.
