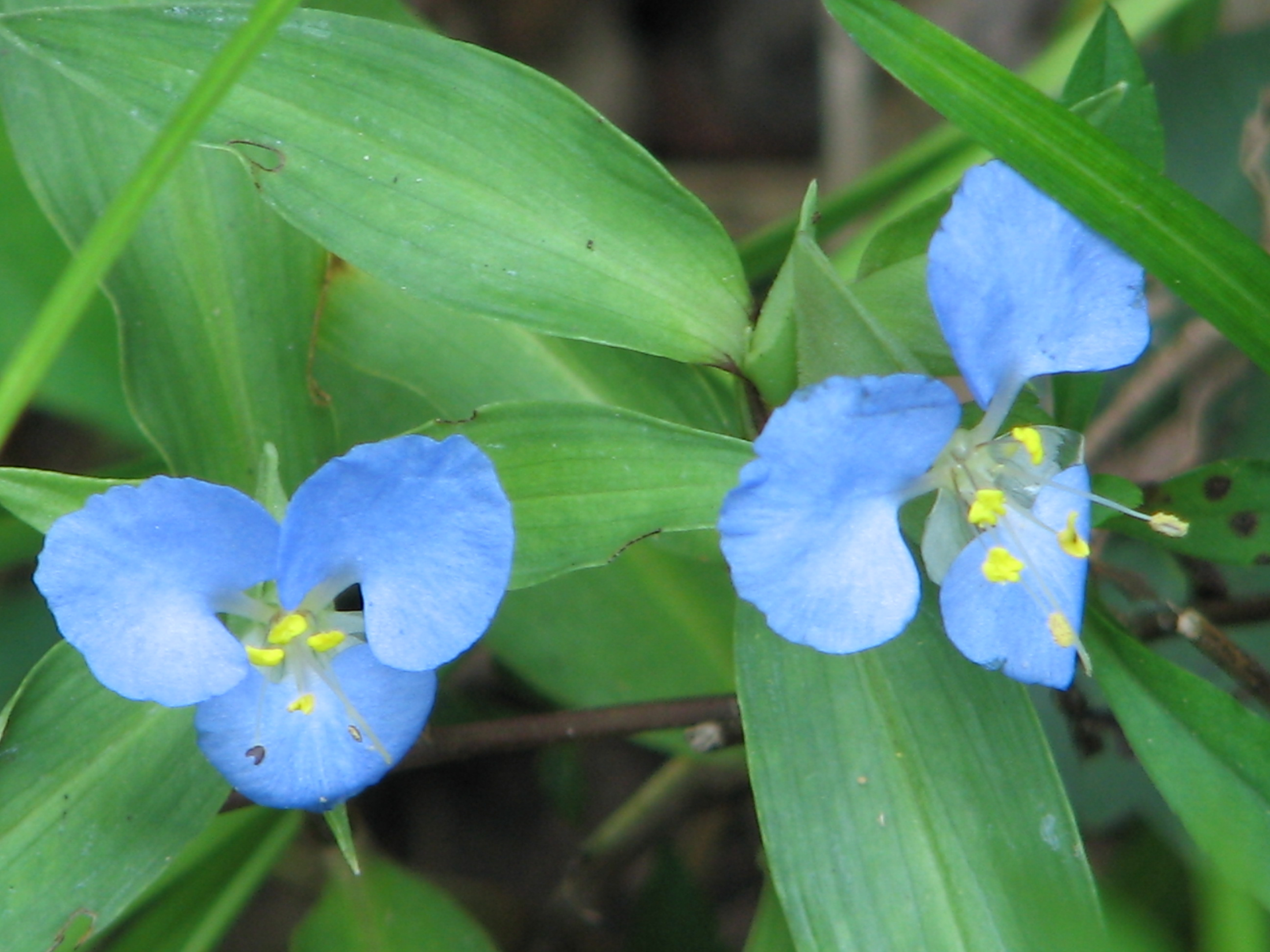
- Specimen at the Congaree National Park in South Carolina, United States

Conservation status
- Secure (NatureServe)

Scientific classification
- Kingdom: Plantae
- Clade: Embryophytes
- Clade: Tracheophytes
- Clade: Spermatophytes
- Clade: Angiosperms
- Clade: Monocots
- Clade: Commelinids
- Order: Commelinales
- Family: Commelinaceae
- Genus: Commelina
- Species: C. virginica

Binomial name
- Commelina virginica L.

= Commelina virginica =

Species of flowering plant

Commelina virginica, commonly known as the Virginia dayflower, is a perennial herbaceous plant in the dayflower family. It is native to the mideastern and southeastern United States, where it is typical of wet soils. While most members of the genus have thin, fibrous roots, the Virginia dayflower is unusual for its genus in having a perennial rhizome. The plant was first described by Carl Linnaeus in his 1762 publication of the second edition of Species Plantarum. A phylogenetic study based on the nuclear ribosomal DNA region 5S NTS and the chloroplast region trnL-trnF, two commonly used gene regions for determining relationships, suggested that Commelina virginica is most closely related to two African species, namely Commelina capitata and Commelina congesta. However, the statistical support for this result was low. Morphologically speaking the supposedly related species do share some unique traits. C. virginica and C. capitata have red hairs at the top of their leaf sheaths, an unusual character in the genus, while C. virginica and C. congesta both have clustered inflorescences on very short stalks.
