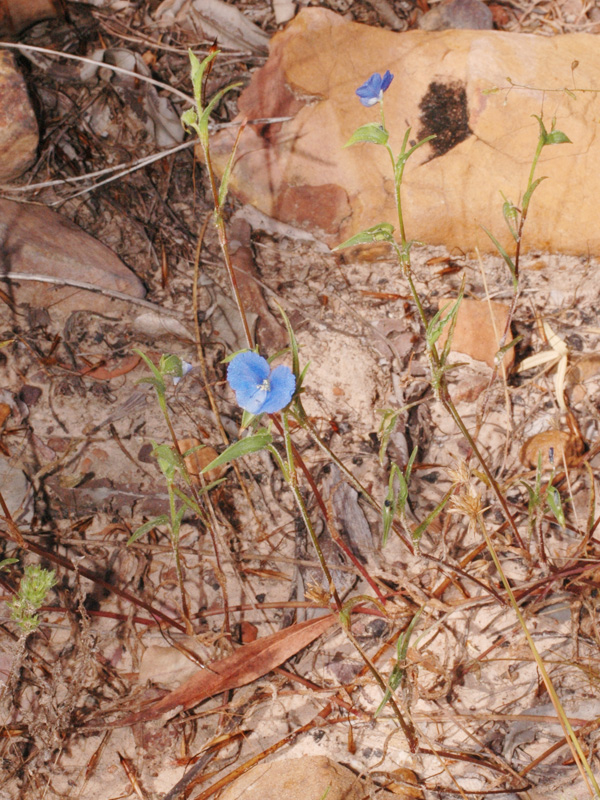

Scientific classification
- Kingdom: Plantae
- Clade: Tracheophytes
- Clade: Angiosperms
- Clade: Monocots
- Clade: Commelinids
- Order: Commelinales
- Family: Commelinaceae
- Tribe: Commelineae
- Genus: Commelina
- Species: C. sp. Sandstone

Binomial name
- Commelina sp. Sandstone

Synonyms
- Lazarum praetermissum

= Commelina sp. Sandstone =

Species of flowering plant

Commelina sp. Sandstone is a herb in the family Commelinaceae family endemic to the Northern Territory of Australia in both Litchfield and Kakadu National Parks.

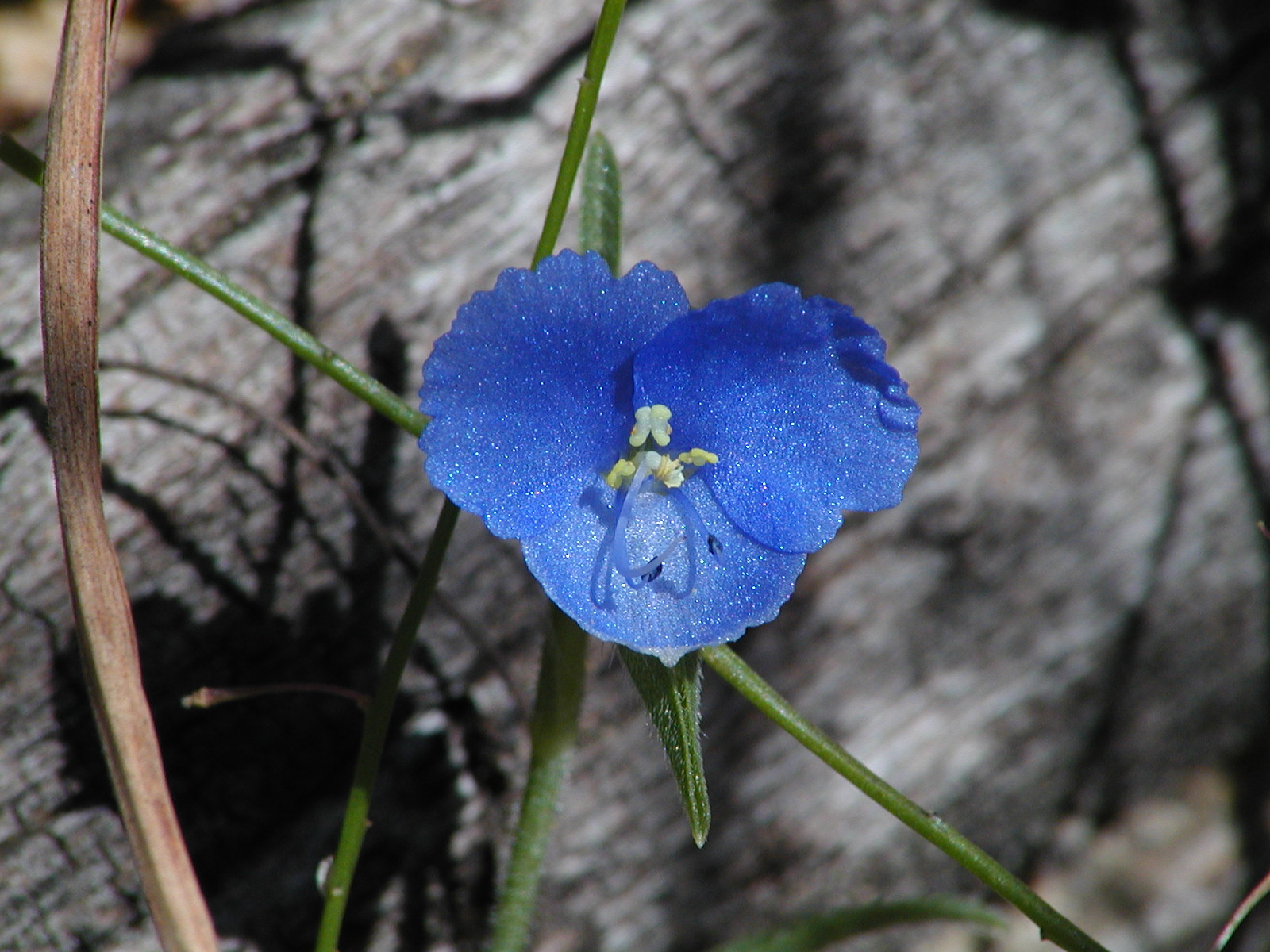

The perennial herb typically grows along the ground to a length of around 1.5 metres long. It is found in open forest or woodland at the base of sandstone slopes or deep sandy soils.

It has been recorded blooming between March and April and December, producing a blue two centimetre flower with three petals. Its fruit, flat, oval capsules, have been recorded in March and April.
