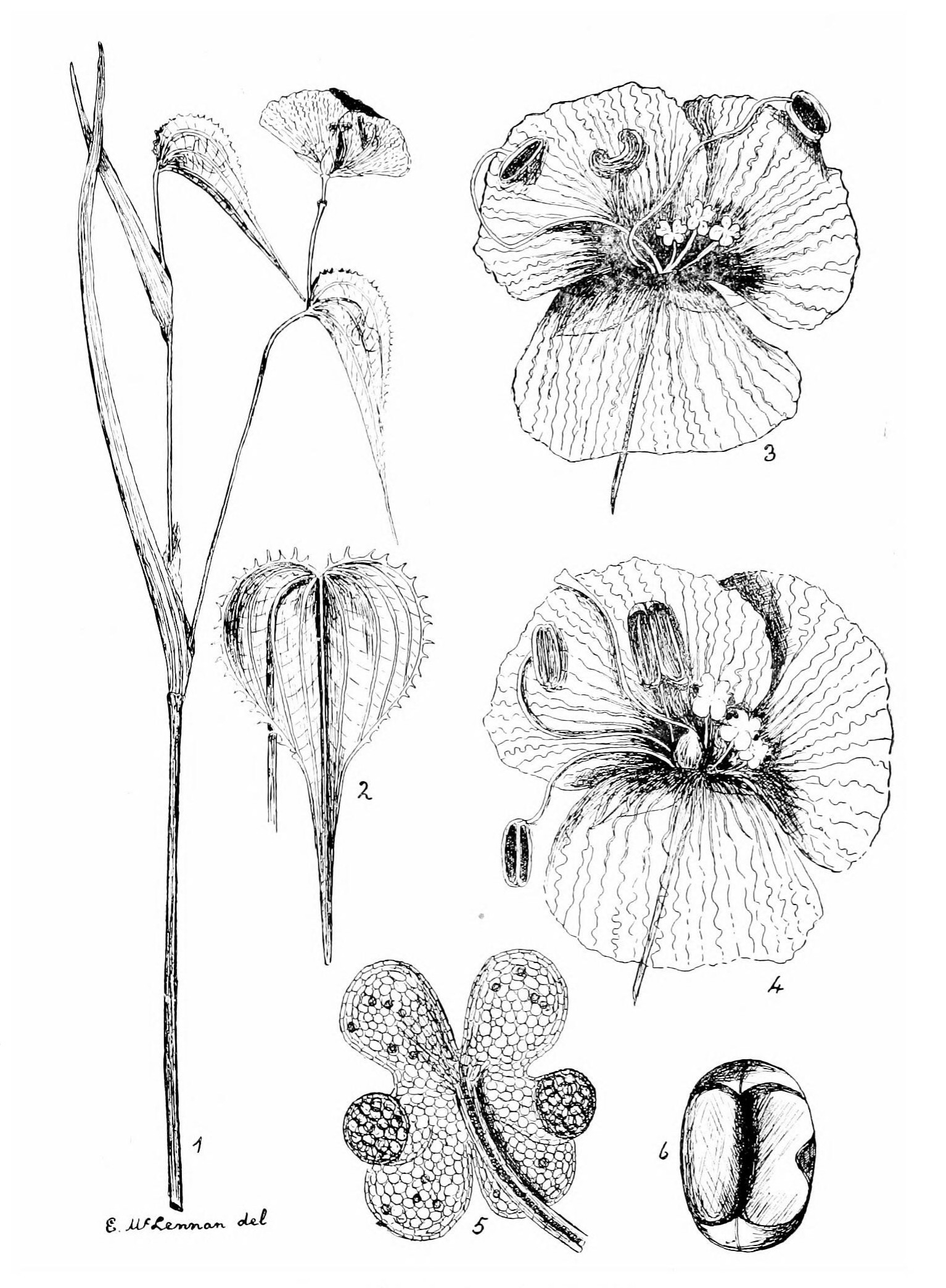
- Commelina ciliata

Conservation status
- Least Concern (TPWCA)

Scientific classification
- Kingdom: Plantae
- Clade: Tracheophytes
- Clade: Angiosperms
- Clade: Monocots
- Clade: Commelinids
- Order: Commelinales
- Family: Commelinaceae
- Genus: Commelina
- Species: C. ciliata

Binomial name
- Commelina ciliata Stanley

Synonyms
- C. acuminata Ewart & McLennan nom.illeg. (synonym); C. lanceolata R.Br (misapplied)

= Commelina ciliata =

Species of flowering plant

Commelina ciliata is found in the Northern Territories and in Western Australia. It is an annual or perennial herb with a prostrate or semi-prostrate habit that can reach 0.7 m in height. It is found in water-retaining soils and areas such as creeks and floodplains. It flowers in the rainy season between March and August and has blue flowers.

The species was first described in 1917 as C. acuminata and since a holotype was not designated at the time, the specimen used for the description has been assigned as the lectotype.
