= Commelina polhillii =

Scientific classification
- Kingdom: Plantae
- Clade: Tracheophytes
- Clade: Angiosperms
- Clade: Monocots
- Clade: Commelinids
- Order: Commelinales
- Family: Commelinaceae
- Genus: Commelina
- Species: C. polhillii

Binomial name
- Commelina polhillii Faden & M.H. Alford

Species of flowering plant

Commelina polhillii is a plant species native to Tanzania, known only from the Iriniga and Mpanda Districts. It occurs in open woodlands and in disturbed sites.

Commelina polhillii is an annual herb with ascendent(=reclining for a while then turning upward) to decumbent (=trailing) stems up to 75 cm long. Stems are flattened on one side, sometimes maroon or with maroon stripes. Leaves are narrowly lanceolate, tapering at the tip, up to 12 cm long, sometimes with cilia (=long soft hairs) along the margins. Spathes are solitary, each with 3 or 4 flowers. Sepals are translucent. Petals are buff-orange, kidney-shaped, broader than long, up to 4 mm across. Seeds are rather unusual for the genus: spherical to elliptical with a crater-shaped pit on one side, with a small raised conical point in the middle of the pit.
