= Commelina kotschyi =

Scientific classification
- Kingdom: Plantae
- Clade: Embryophytes
- Clade: Tracheophytes
- Clade: Spermatophytes
- Clade: Angiosperms
- Clade: Monocots
- Clade: Commelinids
- Order: Commelinales
- Family: Commelinaceae
- Genus: Commelina
- Species: C. kotschyi

Binomial name
- Commelina kotschyi Hassk.

Species of flowering plant

Commelina kotschyi is a monocotyledonous, herbaceous plant in the dayflower family from Africa and India. This annual, blue-flowered plant is found primarily in seasonally waterlogged soils at relatively high elevations. The species has been largely confused in floras, often being misinterpreted as Commelina imberbis. C. kotschyi is most closely related to Commelina lukei, with which it does not overlap in distribution. C. kotschyi is characterised by its appendaged seeds, capsules with a bulging apex, and undulate leaves, among other features.

== Distribution and habitat ==
Commelina kotschyi is distributed across much of Africa, primarily in the east of the continent, and is also found in India. In Africa it occurs from northern Ethiopia in the north, south to South Africa, and has also been collected as far west as Botswana and Angola. In India it is only known from the Western Ghats. This makes it one of only two species of Commelina which occur in northeastern tropical Africa and India, but not on the intermediate Arabian Peninsula. This has led some researchers to suggest that Commelina kotschyi may have been only recently introduced to India.

Commelina kotschyi is found primarily inland at high elevations. It is most commonly found growing in seasonally waterlogged soils.
