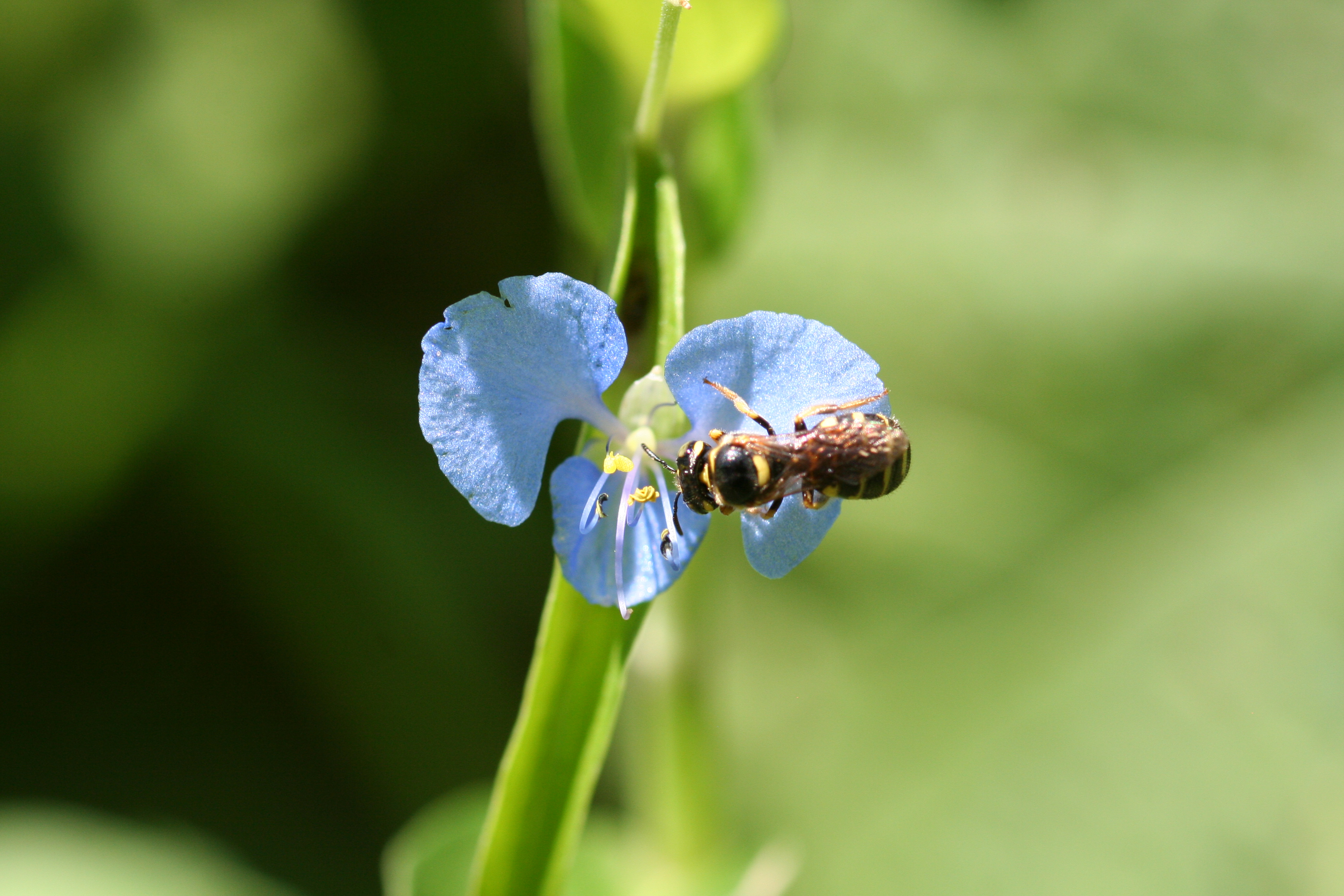
- Flower being visited by a pollinator in Xishuangbanna, Yunnan, China

Conservation status
- Least Concern (IUCN 3.1)

Scientific classification
- Kingdom: Plantae
- Clade: Tracheophytes
- Clade: Angiosperms
- Clade: Monocots
- Clade: Commelinids
- Order: Commelinales
- Family: Commelinaceae
- Genus: Commelina
- Species: C. diffusa

Binomial name
- Commelina diffusa Burm.f.

Subspecies and varieties
- Commelina diffusa subsp. diffusa; Commelina diffusa var. gigas (Small) Faden; Commelina diffusa subsp. montana J.K.Morton; Commelina diffusa var. parva Kayama; Commelina diffusa subsp. violacea Faden

Synonyms
- Synonyms of subsp. diffusa: Commelina agraria Kunth; Commelina agraria var. prostrata (Kunth) Seub.; Commelina agraria var. repens Seub.; Commelina bangii Rusby; Commelina caespitosa Roxb.; Commelina cajennensis Kunth; Commelina canariensis C.Sm.; Commelina cayennensis Rich.; Commelina communis Walter; Commelina communis Engelm. ex Kunth; Commelina diffusa var. major Kayama; Commelina formosa Graham; Commelina gracilis Ruiz & Pav.; Commelina gracilis var. glabrata C.Presl; Commelina nudiflora f. agraria (Kunth) C.B.Clarke; Commelina nudiflora var. werneana (Hassk.) C.B.Clarke; Commelina obtusifolia Vahl; Commelina ochreata Schauer; Commelina pacifica Vahl; Commelina pilosa Pers.; Commelina pilosula Rich.; Commelina prostrata Poepp.; Commelina prostrata Kunth; Commelina sabatieri C.B.Clarke; Commelina sellowii Schltdl.; Commelina werneana Hassk.; Nephralles parviflora Raf.

= Commelina diffusa =

Species of flowering plant

Commelina diffusa, sometimes known as the climbing dayflower or spreading dayflower, is an herbaceous plant in the dayflower family. Its native distribution is Paleotropical, including tropical and southern Africa, Yemen, the Indian Subcontinent, Indochina, Peninsular Malaysia, southern China, Japan, Korea, the Philippines, New Guinea, and the Pacific Islands. It has been introduced throughout the tropical and subtropical Americas, where it is now found from the eastern and midwestern United States to northern Argentina. It has been introduced to the southeastern United States where it is most common in wet disturbed soils. There are two recognised varieties, one being the type and the other being C. diffusa var. gigas, which is native to Asia and has been introduced to Florida. It flowers from spring to fall and is most common in disturbed situations, moist places and forests. In China the plant is used medicinally as a febrifuge and a diuretic. A blue dye is also extracted from the flower for paints. In the Hawaiian Islands, it is known as "honohono grass", although it is technically not a grass. "Honohono" refers to the alternating structure of the leaves. At least one publication lists it as an edible plant in New Guinea.

== Description ==
Commelina diffusa is typically an annual herb, though it may be perennial in the tropics. It spreads diffusely, creeping along the ground, branching heavily and rooting at the nodes, obtaining stem lengths up to 1 metre. Pubescence on the stem is variable and ranges from glabrous to hispidulous, which can occur either in a line or throughout. The leaf blades are relatively variable, ranging from lanceolate to ovate, with proximal leaves tending to be more oblong. They measure 3 to 12 cm in length by 0.8 to 3 cm in width. North American populations tend to have smaller leaf size, typically measuring 1.5 to 5 cm, by 0.5 by 1.8 cm. The leaf apex is acute to acuminate. The leaf surface can be either glabrous (i.e. hairless) or hispid (i.e. bristly). The leaves are subsessile (i.e. having a very small petiole) with a leaf sheath striped with red and covered with hispid pubescence.

The flowers are arranged into cincinni (singular: cincinnus), or scorpioid cymes. This is a form of a monochasium where the lateral branches arise alternately on opposite sides of the false axis. There are typically two cincinni present, with the lower cincinnus bearing 2 to 4 flowers, while the upper cincinnus has one to several flowers. The upper cincinnus is generally exerted on specimens with larger spathes, but it may be included in specimens with smaller spathes. The upper cincinnus bears only male flowers and has a longer peduncle, while the lower cincinnus bears bisexual flowers on a shorter peduncle. The pedicels supporting single flowers, and later the fruits, are thick and curved and measure about 3 to 5 mm. The membranous sepals are inconspicuous at only 3 to 4 mm in length. The petals are blue, though may be lavender in rare cases. The upper two petals measure 4.2 to 6 mm. The anther connective (i.e. the tissue connecting the two halves of the anther) of the centre-most stamen has a broad transverse band of violet. The spathes are solitary, borne on a peduncle and typically falcate (i.e. sickle-shaped) with a cordate (i.e. heart-shaped) to rounded base, acuminate apices and can be either glabrous or hispidulous (i.e. minutely hispid) beneath. They usually measure 0.8 to 2.5 cm long, but may be as short as 0.5 cm and as long as 4 cm. They are typically 0.4 by 1.2 cm wide, but may be up to 1.4 cm long. Their peduncles are usually 0.5 to 2 cm long and rarely up to 2.9 cm. Flowering occurs from May to November. Pollens are elongated with bilateral symmetry, approximate size is 73 microns.

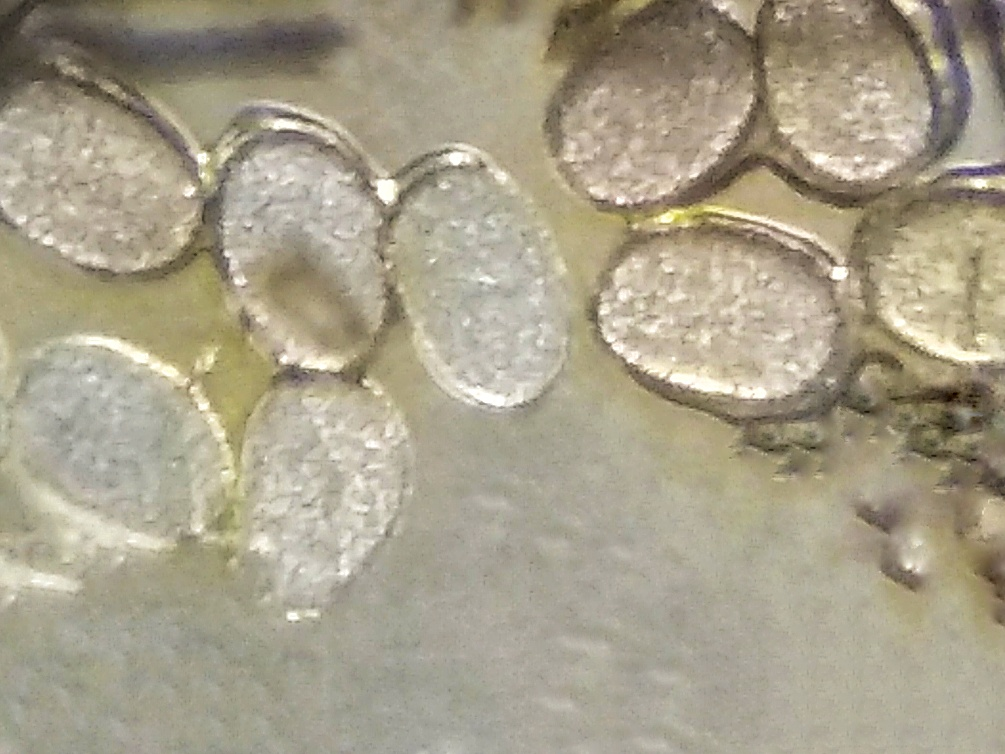
Pollens

The fruit is a capsule which has three locules and 2 valves. It measures 4 to 6.3 mm long by 3 to 4 mm wide, though it may be as narrow as 2.1 mm. They contain five brown seeds that are 2 to 2.8, rarely up to 3.2 mm long, by 1.4 to 1.8 mm wide. They are deeply reticulate (i.e. net-like). The chromosome number is 2n = 30.

== Distribution and habitat ==
C. diffusa is present in tropical and subtropical locations worldwide. It can be found throughout much of southern temperate and subtropical China, specifically in the provinces of Guangdong, southwestern Guangxi, southwestern Guizhou, Hainan, southeastern Tibet and southeastern Yunnan. Within China, it can be found at sea level up to 2,100 metres (6,889 feet), typically being associated with forests, thickets, stream banks and open, humid habitats.

In Japan, the plant has been reported from Yakushima, off Kyūshū, and is also present in the Ryukyu Islands (from Amami Ōshima southwards).

In the West Indies, it is a common weed that is especially associated with roadsides, moist ditches and wasteland, where it can be found from sea level to 1,050 metres. C. diffusa is originally native to the Caribbean Islands, including much of Puerto Rico and several of the U.S. Virgin Islands (including Saint Croix, Saint Thomas and Tortola).

In the United States, it is also typical of disturbed locations, such as gardens, cultivated areas and lawns, but can also be found in woods, near creeks and other moist, partially-shaded areas. It has been introduced to the eastern and southeastern United States, where it is present from Maryland in the north, west to Missouri and south to Texas and Florida. It has also been introduced to Hawaii, where it is a common and quickly-spreading weed. The variety C. diffusa var. gigas has been introduced to Florida. The plant is commonly observed in California, mainly as a seasonal perennial, where it reseeds each fall and reappears in the spring, generally after periods of rain. It is most commonly seen in the Southern Californian counties of Los Angeles, Orange, San Diego, Santa Barbara, and Ventura. Given this distribution, it is likely also present south of the US-Mexico Border, as well.

== Subdivisions ==
Five subdivisions are accepted:

- Commelina diffusa subsp. diffusa – tropical and Southern Africa, Yemen, Indian Subcontinent, Indochina, southern China, Korea, Japan, Taiwan, Philippines, New Guinea, and the Pacific Islands. Introduced to the Americas.
- Commelina diffusa var. gigas (Small) Faden (synonym C. gigas Small) – native range unknown, likely Asia. Introduced to Florida.
- Commelina diffusa subsp. montana J.K.Morton – Nigeria to Gabon, Rwanda, Uganda, and Kenya
- Commelina diffusa var. parva Kayama – Ryukyu Islands
- Commelina diffusa subsp. violacea Faden – Madagascar

== Uses ==
Within China, Commelina diffusa is used as a medicinal herb with febrifugal and diuretic effects. A dye is also obtained from the juice of the petals for use in painting.

Within Hawaii, "honohono grass" was used as medicine to aid with deep cuts. While other Hawaiian herbs just get superficial cuts, honohono grass is an herb to aid with deeper troubling issues.

According to a work by Bruce French published on papuaweb.org, the young leaf tips are cooked and eaten in New Guinea. (See page 80.)
