= Léo Errera =

Belgian botanist (1858–1905)

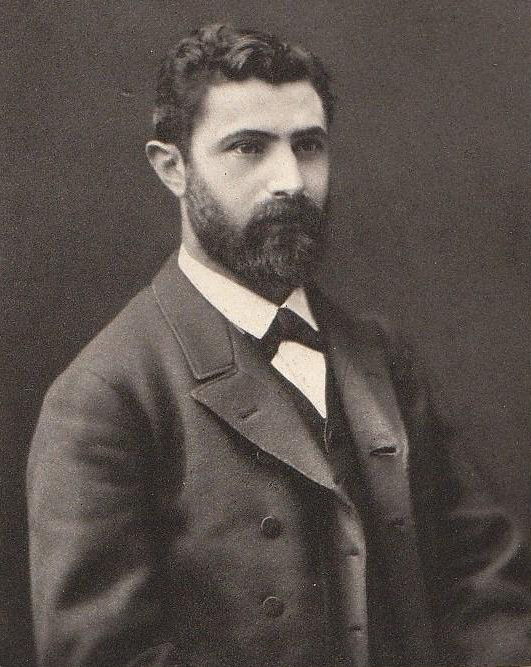

Léo Abram Errera (4 September 1858 in Laeken – 6 August 1905 in Brussels) was a Belgian botanist, known for his research in the field of plant physiology. He worked at the Free University of Brussels in 1883 as an associate and in 1890 as a full professor of botany. In addition, he was actively involved in Jewish affairs.

== Life and work ==
Errera was born in Laeken, the eldest son of Jacques Benoit and Marie Oppenheim. The paternal Sephardi Jewish family was said to have come from Spain where the name was originally spelt Herrera. His younger brother Paul became a professor of law. Jacques was in the banking business and was also a collector of art. On his maternal side several members were intellectuals and his mother read and taught the children. The parents sent Jacques to learn carpentry at a young age and they set up a small home school with tutors that included French emigre Bourzat who taught history and Deluc who taught French, Latin and Greek. Paul Robin taught him science. He then went to the Brussels Athénée where he topped the class. In 1868 the family lived on Rue Royale in Brussels. After receiving his liberal arts degree at the Université libre de Bruxelles (1874), his focus turned to natural sciences, and in 1879 he obtained his doctorate in botanical science. He also got in contact with Charles Darwin and became a defender of evolutionary ideas. He then travelled to Germany, where he furthered his education at the Universities of Strasbourg, Bonn, and Würzburg. In Strasbourg, he conducted research in the laboratories of Anton de Bary and Felix Hoppe-Seyler. He studied histology with Heinrich Waldeyer (1836–1921). At Würzburg, he studied plant physiology under Julius von Sachs.

Following his return to Brussels in 1885 he was appointed lecturer on plant anatomy and physiology, and particularly dealt with the cryptogams, he founded the Laboratoire d'Anatomie et de Physiologie Végétales. This laboratory eventually featured facilities for microscopy and chemistry, a greenhouse, a photography studio, a sterilization chamber, a thermostatic chamber and a darkroom for spectroscopy and polarimetry. He later succeeded Jean-Edouard Bommer (1829–1895) as head of botany.

Errera took a keen interest in plant defences against insect herbivores. He is credited with discovering the presence of glycogen in plants and fungi (amylopectin) through the use of sophisticated histochemical techniques. He later employed these techniques to detect alkaloids in plants.

Errera examined the case of the "Eucharistic miracle" of Brussels in 1370 when a consecrated Host bled after being struck by desecrating Jews. Errera explained that this was most likely because of red spots due to bacteria.

In 1886, he published an important observation linking cell division in plants to the behavior of soap bubbles, which came to be known as Errera's Rule: “the cell plate, at the time of its formation, adopts the geometry that a soap film would take under the same conditions."

Errera was interested in the Antarctic expedition of Adrien de Gerlache (1866–1934) and financed a part of it. He also examined the botanical findings of the expedition and contributed to the reports.

In 1887 he became a corresponding member of the Academie Royale des Sciences de Belgique, and in 1898 was elected a full member. He died in 1905 at the age of 46 from a cerebral embolism. He left 25,000 Francs to the botanical institute which however was transferred to the Royal Academy of sciences.

=== Selected works ===
Errera was a humanist and was disturbed by news of pogroms against Jews in Russia. In 1893 he published "Les Juifs russes : extermination ou émancipation?" (with a prefatory letter by Theodor Mommsen), a book that was later translated and published in English as "The Russian Jews; extermination or emancipation?" Among his principal scientific works are the following:

- Errera L. A., Clautriau G., Maistriaux M. 1887. Premières recherches sur la localisation et la signification des alcaloides dans les plantes. H. Lamertin, Bruxelles. – on alkaloids.
- Planches de physiologie végétale, 1897 – On plant physiology.
- Une leçon elémentaire sur le Darwinisme, 1904 – Elementary lessons on Darwinism.
- Cours de physiologie moléculaire, 1907 – Course on molecular physiology.
- Recueil d'oeuvres de Léo Errera, 1908 – Collected works of Léo Errera.
