= Clavus clavata =

Scientific classification
- Kingdom: Animalia
- Phylum: Mollusca
- Class: Gastropoda
- Subclass: Caenogastropoda
- Order: Neogastropoda
- Superfamily: Conoidea
- Family: Drilliidae
- Genus: Clavus
- Species: C. clavata

Binomial name
- Clavus clavata (Sowerby II, 1870)

Synonyms
- Clavus (Tylotiella) clavata (Sowerby II, 1870); Drillia clavata Sowerby II, 1870; Drillia decenna W.H. Dall, 1908; Mangelia clavata Sowerby II, 1870 (original description)

Species of gastropod

Clavus clavata is a species of sea snail, a marine gastropod mollusk in the family Drilliidae.

== Description ==
The elongate, fusiform shell has an acuminate spire. Its color is white with red ribs. The whorls are longitudinally ribbed and spirally striated. The outer lip is strongly produced. The siphonal canal is elongate.

== Distribution ==
This species is found in the demersal zone of the Eastern Pacific Ocean off China.
