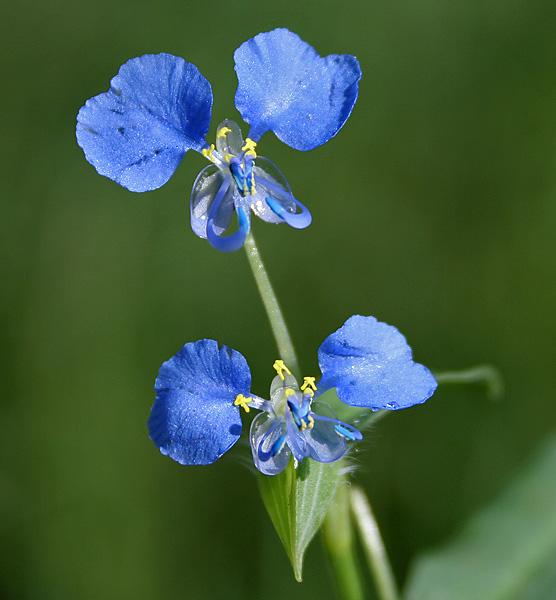
- Specimen from Hyderabad, India; the winged blue stamen filaments are characteristic of the species

Scientific classification
- Kingdom: Plantae
- Clade: Tracheophytes
- Clade: Angiosperms
- Clade: Monocots
- Clade: Commelinids
- Order: Commelinales
- Family: Commelinaceae
- Genus: Commelina
- Species: C. forskaolii

Binomial name
- Commelina forskaolii Vahl, 1805

= Commelina forskaolii =

Species of flowering plant

Commelina forskaolii, sometimes known as rat's ear, is an herbaceous plant in the dayflower family native to much of Africa, Arabia, and India. It has also been introduced to Florida in the United States. It is considered a common species in most of its range. It can be easily recognized by its bright blue flowers with winged stamen filaments. The seeds are also distinctive with distinctive irregular ridges on their sides. It often forms dense mats, and can be found most commonly in sandy soils in at least somewhat sunny situations. The species is considered a weed in many areas because of its hardiness and ability to produce cleistogamous flowers.
