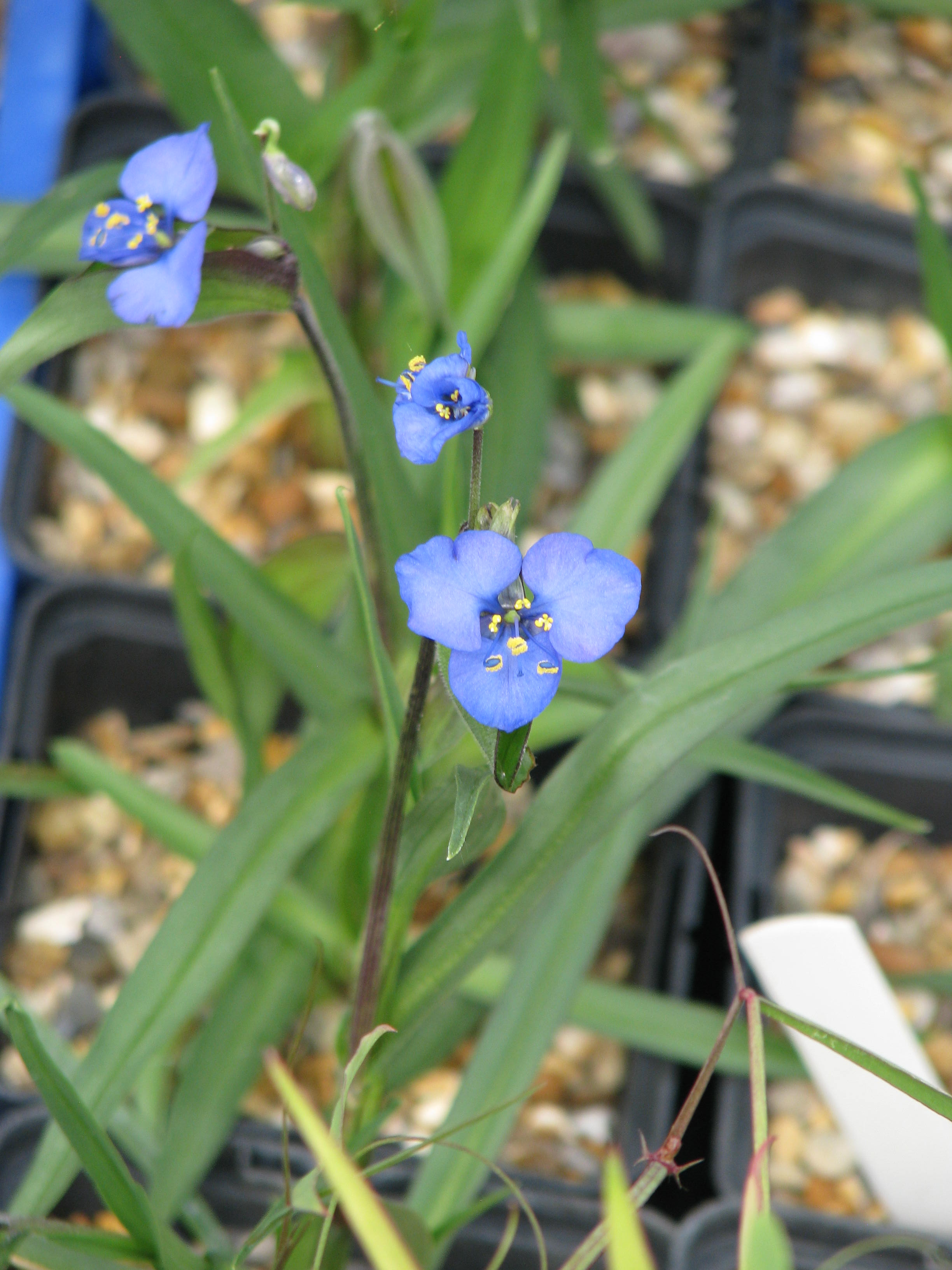

Conservation status
- Secure (NatureServe)

Scientific classification
- Kingdom: Plantae
- Clade: Tracheophytes
- Clade: Angiosperms
- Clade: Monocots
- Clade: Commelinids
- Order: Commelinales
- Family: Commelinaceae
- Genus: Commelina
- Species: C. dianthifolia

Binomial name
- Commelina dianthifolia Delile

= Commelina dianthifolia =

Birdbill dayflower

Species of flowering plant

Commelina dianthifolia, known as the birdbill dayflower, is a perennial herb native to mountains in the south-western United States (Arizona, Colorado, New Mexico, Texas) and northern Mexico. Petals are blue while sepals are green. The inflorescence is a scorpioid cyme and it is subtended by a boat-like spathe.

== Uses ==
An infusion of plant used by Keres people as a strengthener for weakened tuberculosis patients. The Ramah Navajo give a cold simple or compound infusion to livestock as an aphrodisiac.
