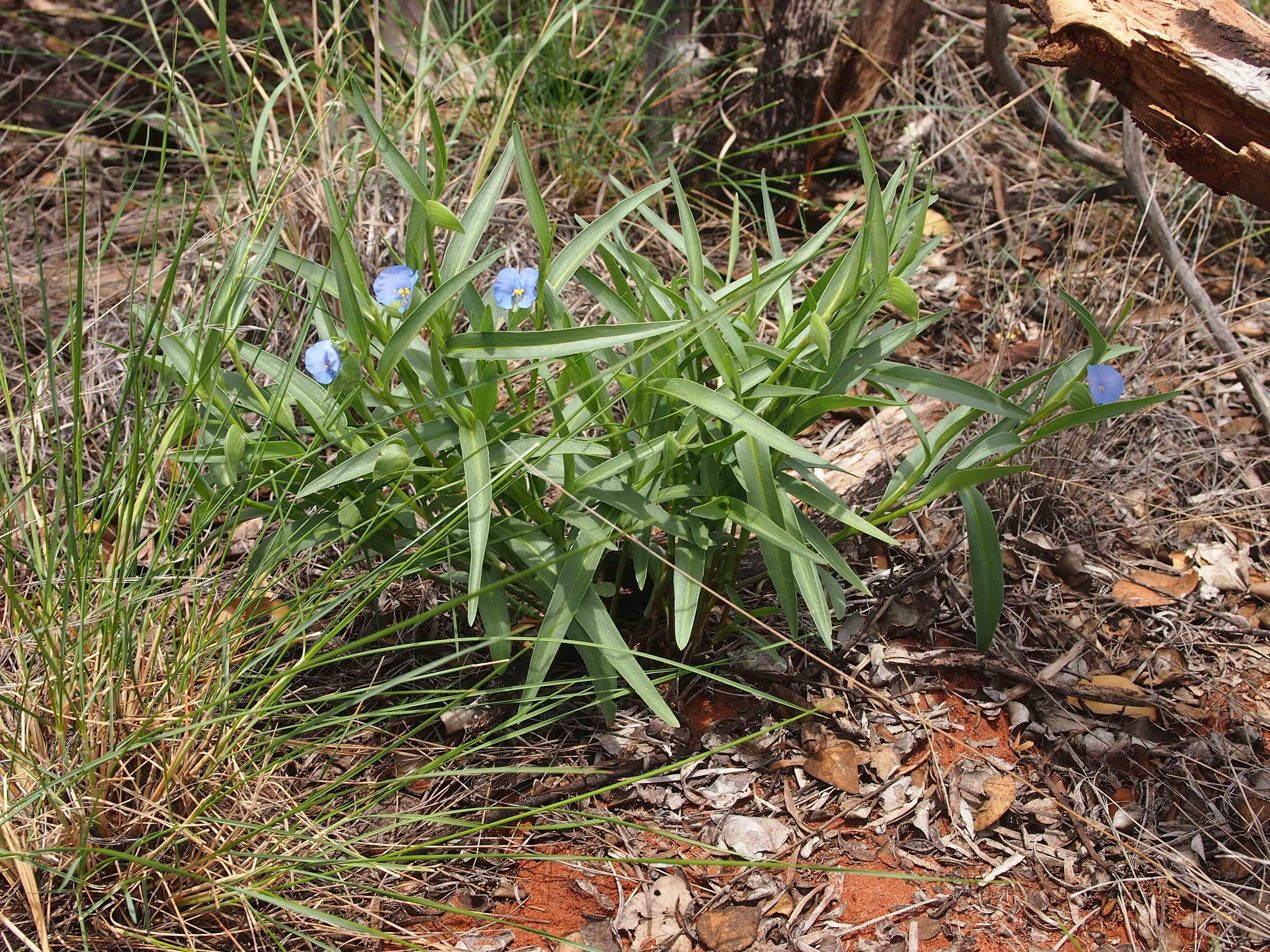

Scientific classification
- Kingdom: Plantae
- Clade: Tracheophytes
- Clade: Angiosperms
- Clade: Monocots
- Clade: Commelinids
- Order: Commelinales
- Family: Commelinaceae
- Genus: Commelina
- Species: C. ensifolia

Binomial name
- Commelina ensifolia R.Br.

= Commelina ensifolia =

Species of flowering plant

Commelina ensifolia, commonly known as scurvy weed, scurvy grass or wandering Jew, is an annual herb native to Australia, India, and Sri Lanka.

The species grows as a prostrate herb, producing roots from the stem at the nodes. Flowers are bright blue with three petals, however one petal is much smaller than the others, often producing an appearance of two petals. The species prefers moist soils, but has a broad natural range, extending from coastal monsoon forest to the arid central deserts where it grows as an ephemeral following favourable rains. The species has been eaten as a green vegetable by Aboriginals. European settlers also ate the plant to prevent scurvy, giving rise the common name of scurvy grass.

The species is a minor weed in some parts of its natural range.
