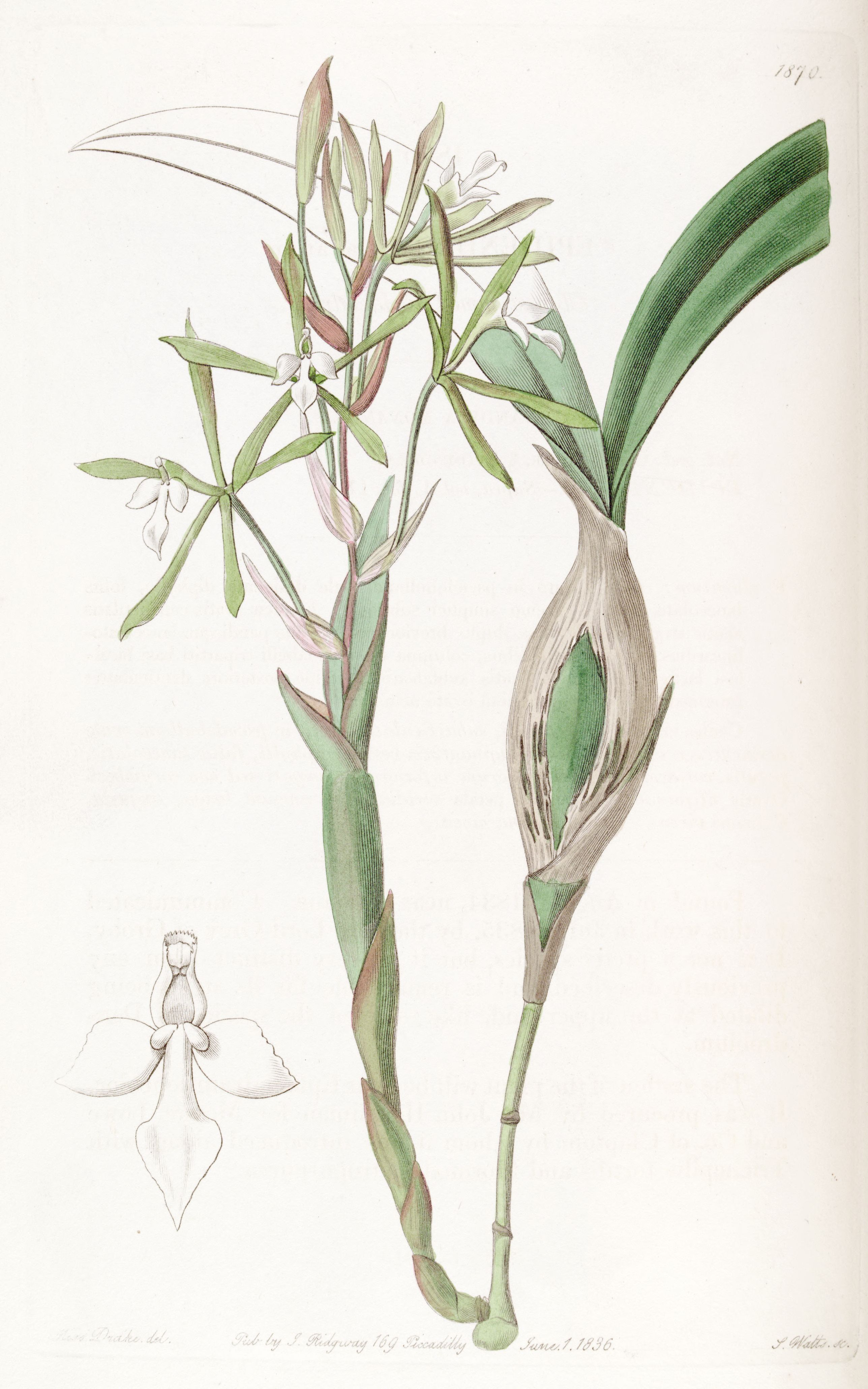

Scientific classification
- Kingdom: Plantae
- Clade: Tracheophytes
- Clade: Angiosperms
- Clade: Monocots
- Order: Asparagales
- Family: Orchidaceae
- Subfamily: Epidendroideae
- Genus: Epidendrum
- Species: E. purpurascens

Binomial name
- Epidendrum purpurascens Focke

Synonyms
- Coilostylis clavata (Raf.) Withner & P.A.Harding; Didothion clavatum Raf.; Epidendrum clavatum Lindl.; Epidendrum clavatum var. purpurascens (Focke) Cogn.; Epidendrum bungerothii Schltr.; Epidendrum glumibracteum Rchb.f.; Epidendrum psilanthemum Loefgr.; Maxillaria glumibracteum (Rchb.f.) Hemsl.

= Epidendrum purpurascens =

Species of orchid

Epidendrum purpurascens (syn. Coilostylis clavata) is a species of orchid in the genus Epidendrum.
