= Émile Auguste Joseph De Wildeman =

Belgian botanist (1866–1947)

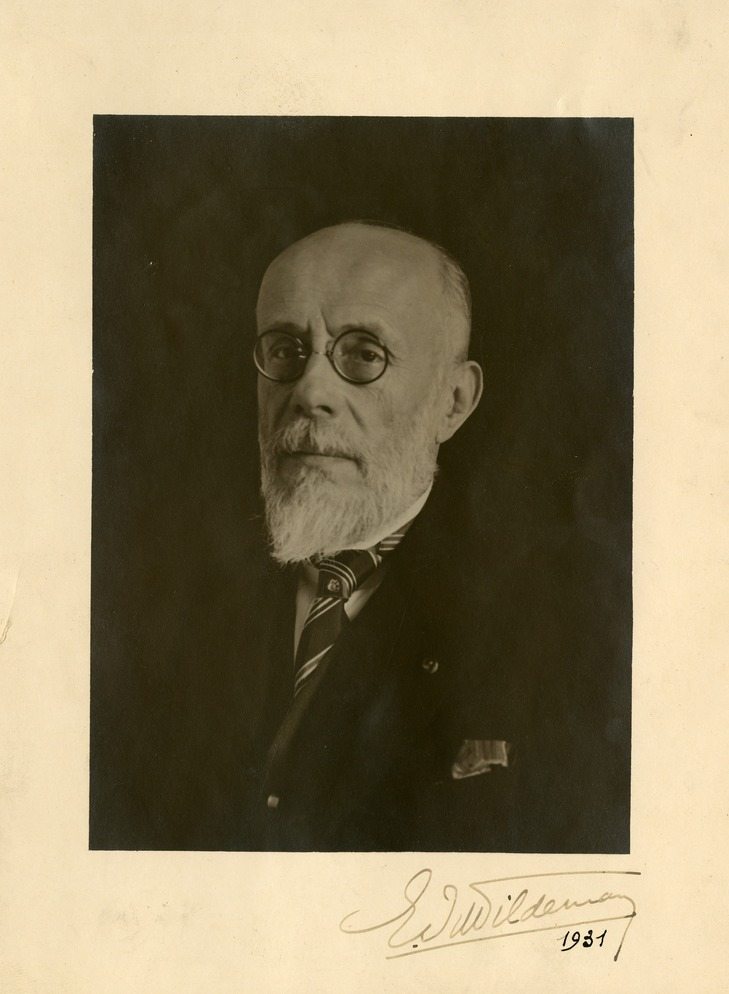
- De Wildeman in 1931
- Born: 19 October 1866; Saint-Josse-ten-Noode, Belgium
- Died: 1947
- Education: Université libre de Bruxelles
- Known for: Flora of the Belgian Congo; Taxonomy of Central African plants; Studies in phycology
- Scientific career
- Fields: Botany; phycology
- Workplaces: Botanical Garden of Brussels
- Doctoral advisor: Léo Errera
- Author abbrev. (botany): De Wild.

Émile Auguste Joseph De Wildeman (19 October 1866 – 1947) was a Belgian botanist, mycologist, and phycologist. He is known for his investigations of Congolese flora.

From 1883 to 1887, he studied pharmacy at the Université libre de Bruxelles. In 1891, he began work as a preparateur at the Botanical Garden of Brussels, an institution where he later served as director. In 1892, he received his doctorate in sciences (academic advisor, Léo Errera) and in 1926 attained the title of professor.

== Selected works ==
- Contributions a l'étude de la flore de Bulgarie, 1894 (with A. Tocheff, (1867–1944)) – Contributions to the Study of Bulgarian Flora.
- Prodrome de la flore algologique des Indes Néerlandaises (Indes Néerlandaises et parties des territoires de Bornéo et de la Papuasie non Hollandaises), 1897 – Prodome of phycological flora in the Netherlands East Indies.
- Illustrations de la flore du Congo, 1898 to 1920 (with Théophile Alexis Durand, 1855–1912) – Illustrations of Congolese flora.
- Les algues de la flore de Buitenzorg : essai d'une flore algologique de Java, 1900 – Algae of Buitenzorg; an essay on algae of Java.
- Les plantes tropicales de grande culture, 1902 – Agricultural tropical plants.
- Notices sur des plantes utiles ou intéressantes de la flore du Congo, 1903 – Useful and interesting plants of the Congo.
- Etudes de systématique et de géographie botaniques sur la flore du Bas- et du Moyen-Congo, 1903 – Studies on systematics and phytogeography of the lower and middle Congo.
- Les phanérogames des Terres Magellaniques., 1905 – Phanerogams of Magellanic regions.
- Documents pour l'ètude de la geo-botanique congolaise, 1913 – Documents for the study of Congolese geobotany.
- Contribution à l'étude de la flore du Katanga, 1921 – Contribution to the study of flora native to Katanga.
- Sur des plantes médicinales ou utiles du Mayumbe (Congo Belge), 1938 – On medicinal and useful plants of Mayumbe.
