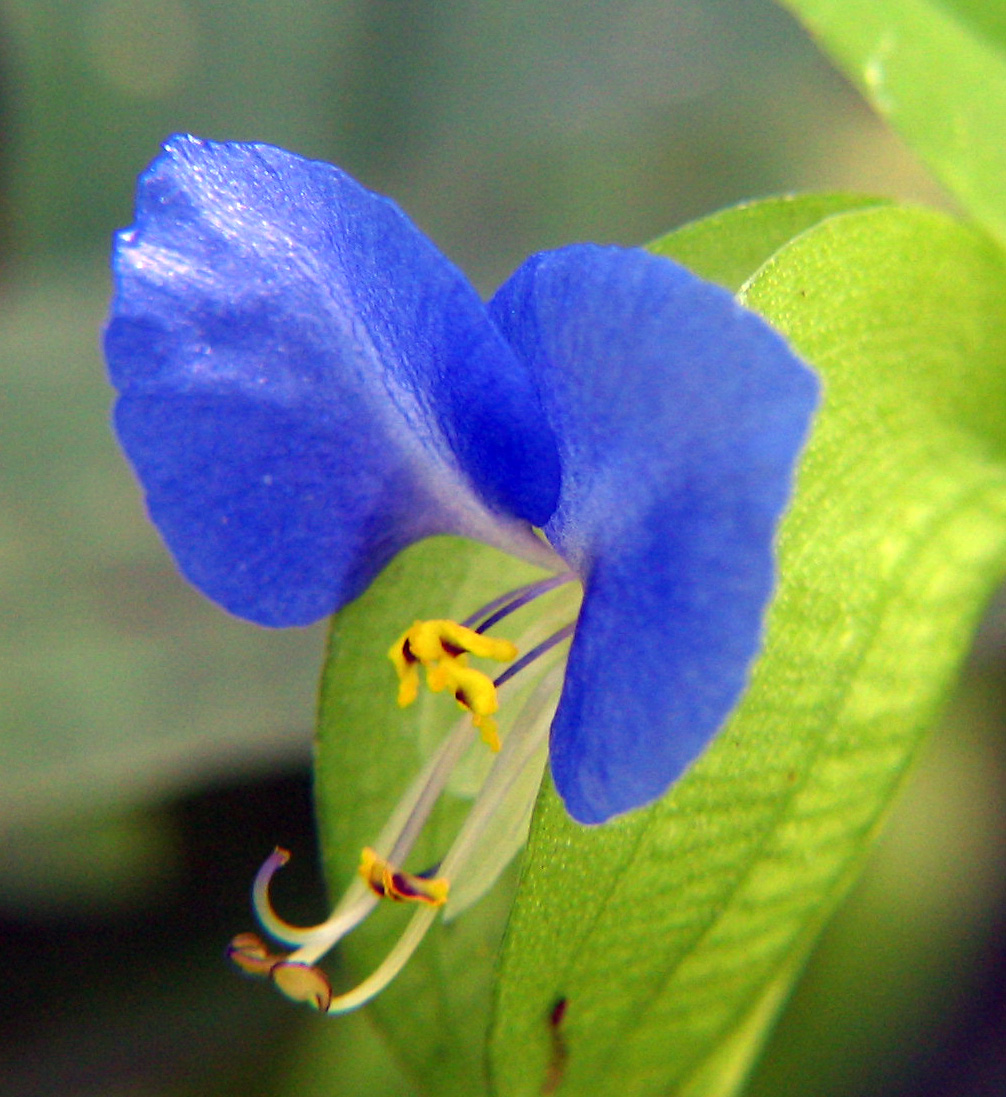
- Commelina communis flower with typical arrangement of floral parts: 3 staminodes are present above, 3 fertile stamens below with the central one differing in size and form, and a single style emerging between them (curved in this species).

Scientific classification
- Kingdom: Plantae
- Clade: Tracheophytes
- Clade: Angiosperms
- Clade: Monocots
- Clade: Commelinids
- Order: Commelinales
- Family: Commelinaceae
- Tribe: Commelineae
- Genus: Commelina; L.

Type species
- Commelina communis L.

Species
- See List of Commelina species

Synonyms
- Allosperma Raf.; Allotria Raf.; Ananthopus Raf.; Athyrocarpus Schltdl. ex Benth. 1883 not Schltdl. 1855 nor Schltdl. ex Hassk. 1866; Commelinopsis Pichon; Dirtea Raf.; Disecocarpus Hassk.; Erxlebia Medik.; Eudipetala Raf.; Hedwigia Medik.; Heterocarpus Wight; Isanthina Rchb. ex Steud.; Larnalles Raf.; Lechea Lour.; Nephralles Raf.; Omphalotheca Hassk.; Ovidia Raf.; Phaeosphaerion Hassk.; Spathodithyros Hassk.; Tapheocarpa Conran; Trithyrocarpus Hassk.

= Commelina =

Genus of flowering plants

Commelina is a genus of approximately 208 species commonly called dayflowers due to the short lives of their flowers, and less often known as widow's tears. It is by far the largest genus of its family, Commelinaceae. The Swedish taxonomist Carl Linnaeus of the 18th century named the genus after the two Dutch botanists Jan Commelijn and his nephew Caspar, each representing one of the showy petals of Commelina communis.

The dayflowers are herbs that may be either perennial or annual. They are characterised by their zygomorphic flowers and by the involucral bracts called spathes that surround the flower stalks. These spathes are often filled with a mucilaginous liquid. Each spathe houses either one or two scorpioid cymes, with the upper cyme being either vestigial or bearing from one to several typically male flowers, and the lower cyme bearing several flowers. All members of the genus have alternate leaves.

The Asiatic dayflower (Commelina communis) is probably the best known species in the West. It is a common weed in parts of Europe and throughout eastern North America. Several species, such as Commelina benghalensis, are eaten as a leaf vegetable in Southeast Asia and Africa.

== Description ==
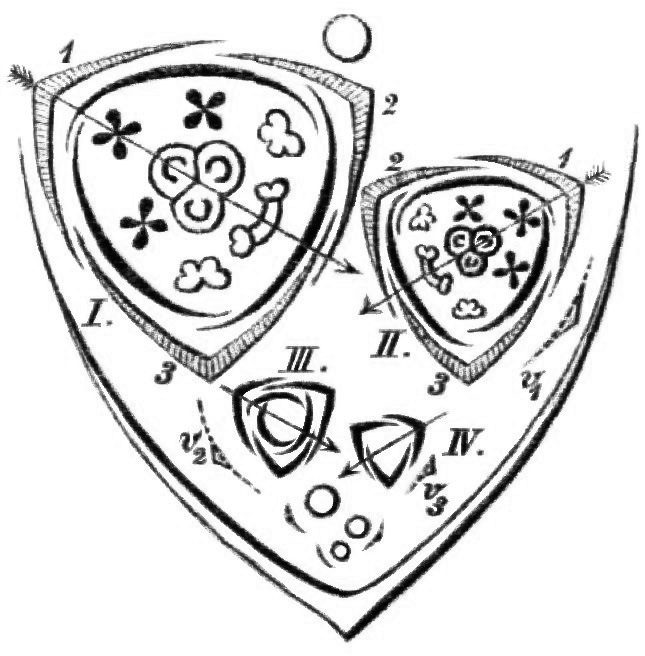
Floral diagram of a cyme of Commelina coelestis from Eichler's 1875 "Blütendiagramme"

Plants in the genus are perennial or annual herbs with roots that are usually fibrous or rarely tuberous or rhizomatous. The leaves are distichous (i.e. 2-ranked) or spirally arranged with blades that either lack or have a petiole. The ptyxis, or the way the leaf is folded in the bud, is either involute (i.e. having inrolled margins) or supervolute.

The inflorescences are terminal, meaning the stem terminates with an inflorescence, and often leaf opposed, meaning it emerges at the node with a leaf of a new axillary stem. The inflorescence is composed of one or two cincinni, also called scorpioid cymes, which are monochasia (i.e. cymes with a single branched main false axis) in which the lateral branches arise alternately on opposite sides of the false axis. The distal cincinnus may either be vestigial or contain one to several flowers that are typically male. The proximal cyme is always present and is multi-flowered. The cincinni are enclosed in a folded spathe, a modified leaf, which is often filled with a mucilaginous liquid. The spathe may either have completely distinct margins or they may be fused to varying degrees at the basal end.

The flowers are borne on pedicels and are strongly zygomorphic, meaning there is only a single plane of symmetry. Bracteoles occasionally subtend the pedicels, but they are usually absent. The flowers are either bisexual or male. There are three unequal sepals, which may either be free or the two lateral ones may be fused. The petals are free and unequal with the two upper ones being larger and clawed while the lower petal is typically reduced and often differs in colour from the other two. Flower colour is most typically blue, but lilac, lavender, yellow, peach, apricot and white also occur. There are three stamens and two to three staminodes, or infertile stamens, all of which have free, glabrous filaments. The staminodes occur posteriorly and have antherodes with four to six lobes. The stamens are anterior and are longer than the staminodes. The medial stamen differs in size and form from the lateral two, and when a central staminode is present it also differs from the other staminodes. The ovaries are bi- or trilocular and one to two ovules is present per locule.

The fruit is a capsule that is typically bi- or trilocular, but in rare cases may be unilocular, and it is bi- or trivalved. The locules may contain one or two seeds, or no seed at all. The seeds are uniseriate (i.e. arranged in a single row), have a linear hilum and a lateral embryotega.

== See also ==
- List of Commelina species
