= Episyrphus nigromarginatus =

Scientific classification
- Kingdom: Animalia
- Phylum: Arthropoda
- Class: Insecta
- Order: Diptera
- Family: Syrphidae
- Genus: Episyrphus
- Species: E. nigromarginatus

Binomial name
- Episyrphus nigromarginatus (Vockeroth, 1973)

Species of hoverfly

Episyrphus nigromarginatus is a species of hoverfly first recorded in Transvaal, South Africa. It was described as a «small, moderately slender species» with respect to other South African Episyrphus species such as E. circularis or E. flavibasis.
