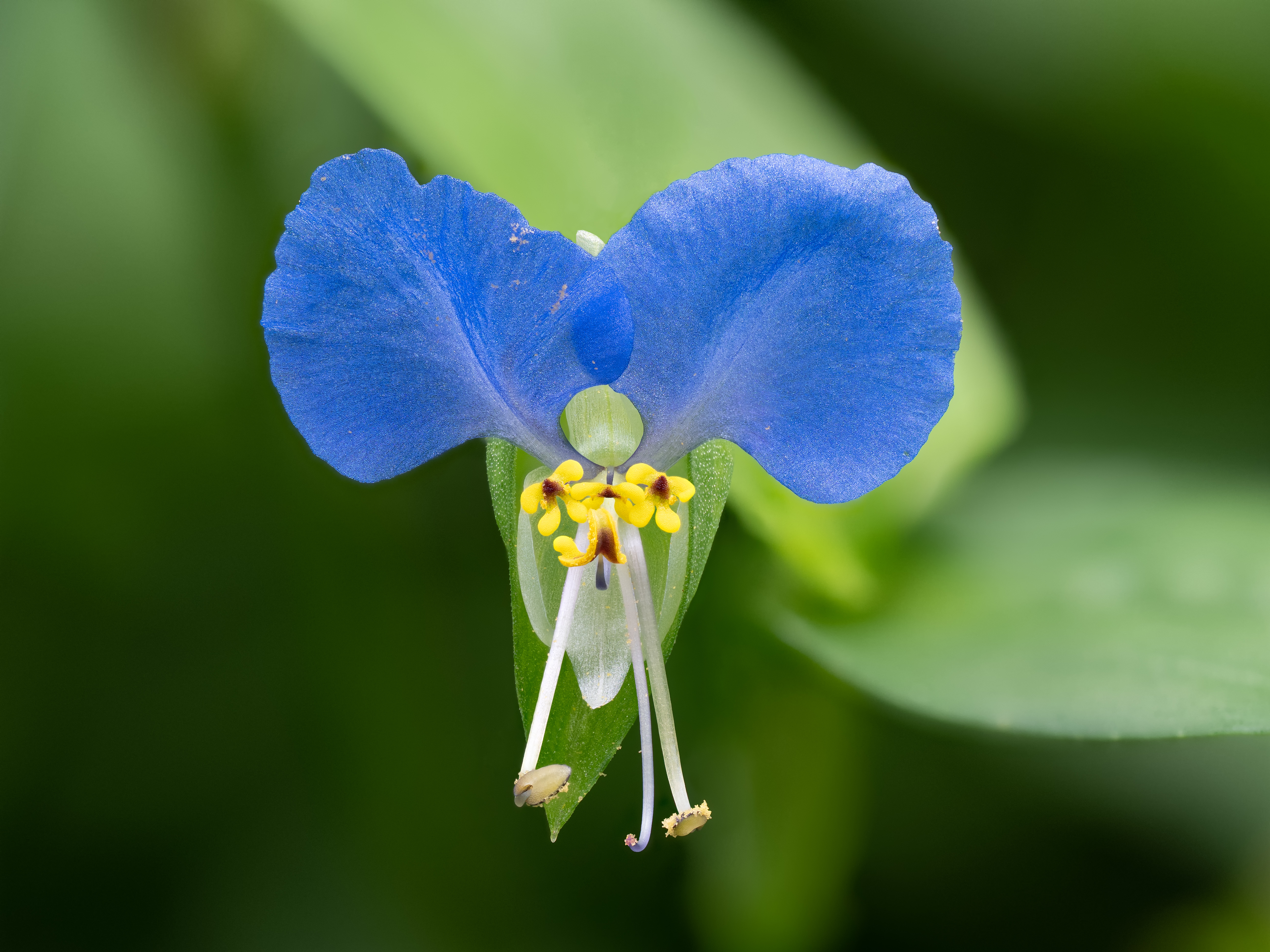
- Commelina communis flowers

Conservation status
- Secure (NatureServe)

Scientific classification
- Kingdom: Plantae
- Clade: Tracheophytes
- Clade: Angiosperms
- Clade: Monocots
- Clade: Commelinids
- Order: Commelinales
- Family: Commelinaceae
- Genus: Commelina
- Species: C. communis

Binomial name
- Commelina communis L.
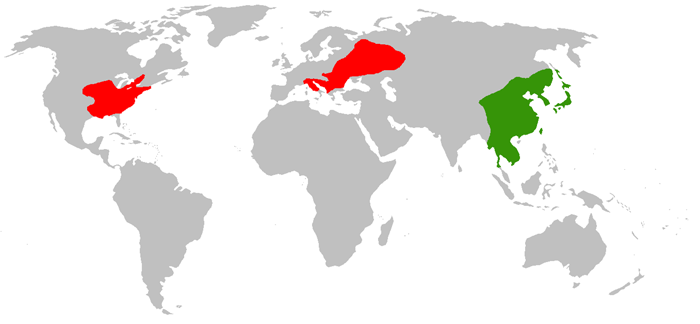
- Green = native, Red = introduced

= Commelina communis =

Asiatic dayflower

Species of flowering plant

Commelina communis the Asiatic dayflower, is an herbaceous annual plant in the dayflower family. It gets its name because the blooms last for only one day. It is native throughout much of East Asia and northern parts of Southeast Asia. In China, the plant is known as yazhicao (simplified Chinese: 鸭 跖 草; traditional Chinese: 鴨跖草; pinyin: yāzhīcǎo), roughly translating to "duckfoot herb", while in Japan it is known as tsuyukusa (露 草, tsuyukusa), meaning "dew herb". It has also been introduced to parts of central and southeastern Europe and much of eastern North America, where it has spread to become a noxious weed. It is common in disturbed sites and in moist soil. The flowers emerge from summer through fall and are distinctive with two relatively large blue petals and one very small white petal.

The Asiatic dayflower plant serves as the type species for its large genus. Linnaeus picked the name Commelina in honour of the two Dutch botanists of the Commelijn family, using the two large showy petals of Commelina communis to symbolise them. Linnaeus described the species in the first edition of his landmark work, Species Plantarum, in 1753. Long before the plant was studied in Europe, however, it had been used for generations in traditional Chinese medicine. The flowers have also been used in Japan to produce a dye and a pigment that was used in many world-renowned Ukiyo-e woodcuts from the 18th and early 19th centuries. In the modern era the plant has found limited use as a model organism in the field of plant physiology due to its complex pigment chemistry and the ease of viewing its stomata.

The Asiatic dayflower is considered a weed both in areas where it was introduced and in certain parts of its native range. The flowers' interactions with pollinators have been well studied and have helped to support important hypotheses about pollination in the field of plant ecology. Recent research has also revealed that the Asiatic dayflower can bioaccumulate a number of metals, making it a candidate for revegetating and essentially cleaning spoiled copper mines. Several animals and fungi use the plant as a food source, with a few species feeding upon it exclusively.

== Description ==
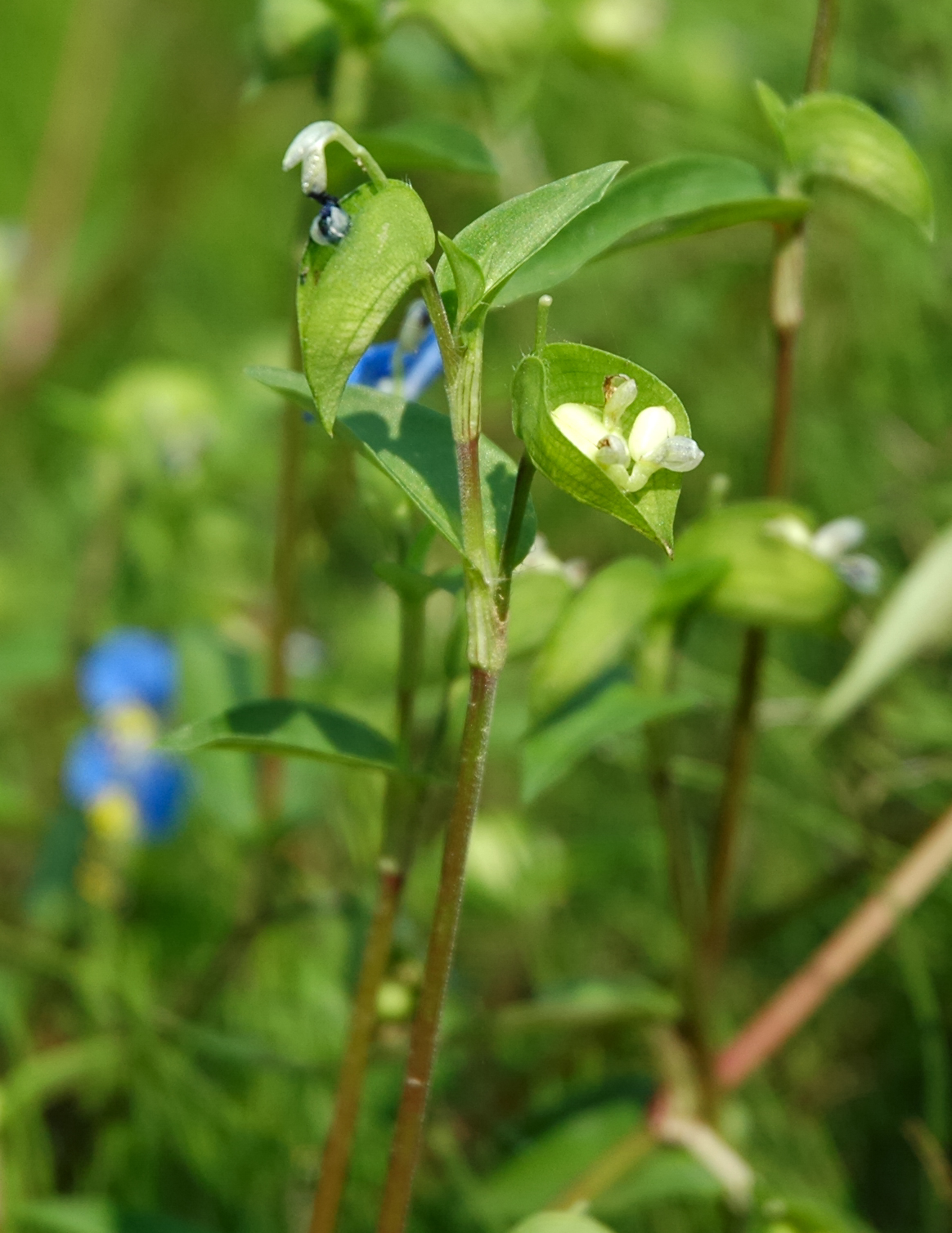
The spathe at left shows two faded flowers, one on the upper and one on the lower cincinnus; the spathe at right has two capsules starting to form on the lower cincinnus; notice the contrasting veins on both spathes

The Asiatic dayflower is an annual herb with stems that are typically decumbent, meaning that they are prostrate at the base but become erect towards the tips, but some individuals may be simply erect. The diffusely branched stems tend to root at the basal nodes. The pubescence on the stems is variable, but common patterns include a line of hair continuous with the leaf sheath, or they may be glabrous basally, meaning hairless, and puberulent towards the extremities, that is covered with fine hairs. The leaves are sessile: they lack a leaf stalk, also known as a petiole; or they may be subpetiolate, meaning they have very small petioles. The leaf sheaths are cylindrical, sometimes striped with red, and typically glabrous, but usually have margins that are puberulent or pilose, meaning lined with fine, soft hairs. The leaf blades range from narrowly lanceolate, or lance-shaped, to ovate–elliptic, between egg-shaped and ellipse-shaped. They measure 3–12 cm (1 1/4–4 3/4 in) by 1–4 cm (1/2–1 1/2 in) wide. The blades range from glabrous to puberulent and have scabrescent, or slightly rough, margins. Their tips are acute, meaning they come to a point quickly, to acuminate, meaning the point develops gradually. The leaf bases are oblique, or uneven.

The flowers are arranged on inflorescences called cincinni (singular: cincinnus), which are also called scorpioid cymes. This is a form of a monochasium where the lateral branches arise alternately. The cincinni are subtended by a spathe, a modified leaf. The solitary spathes usually measure 1.2–3 cm (1/2–1 1/4 in) long, but some may be up to 3.5 cm (1 1/2 in) in length, while they are 0.8–1.3 cm (1/4–1/2 in) tall, but sometimes up to 1.8 cm (3/4 in). The uncurved spathes typically have a cordate, or heart-shaped, whitish base, which contrasts with its dark green veins. Their margins lack hairs, are somewhat scabrous, or rough, and are unfused, meaning they are distinct to the base. Their apices are acute to acuminate while the surfaces are glabrous, puberulent, or hirsute–ciliate, meaning with longer, shaggier hairs. The spathes are borne on peduncles, or stalks, that measure 0.8–3.5 cm (1/4–1 1/2 in) and sometimes up to 5 cm (2.0 in) long.

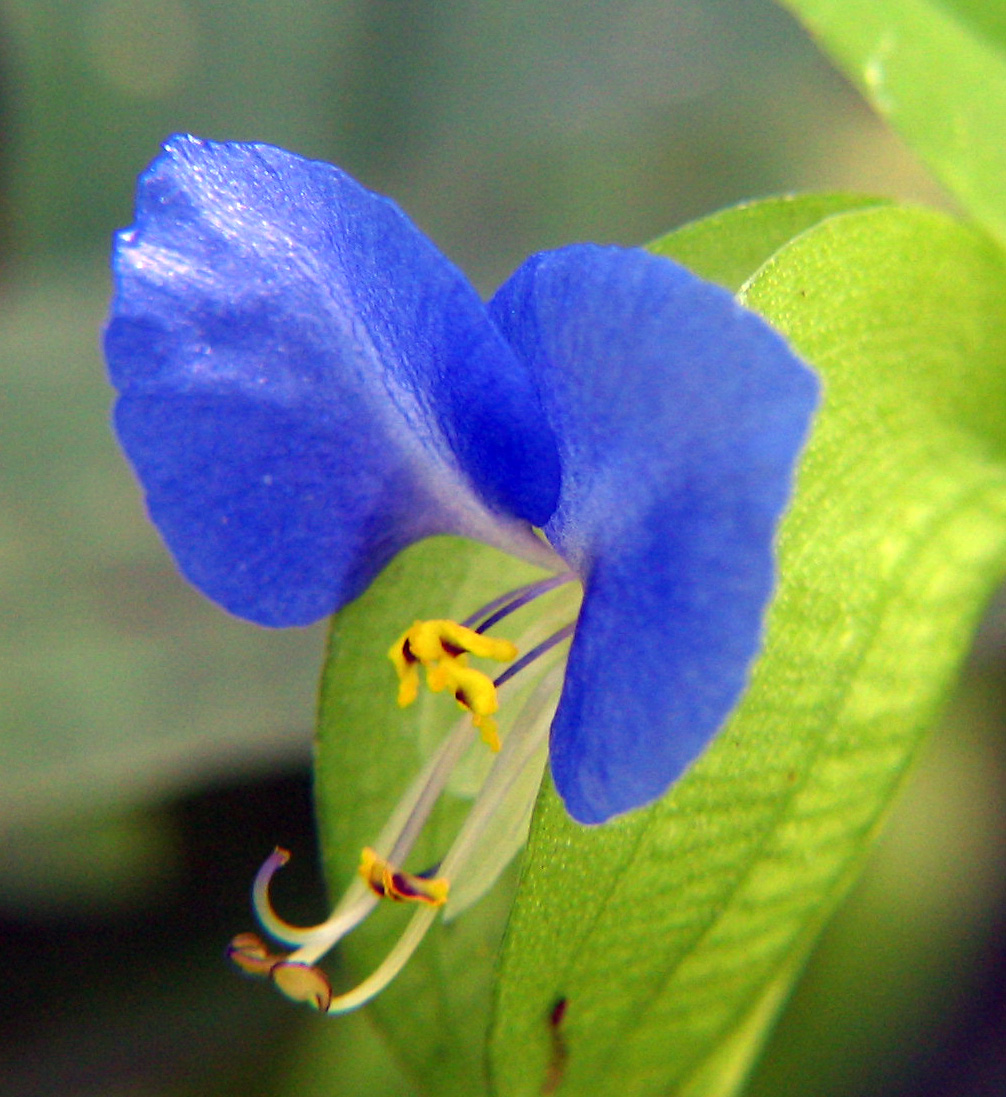
The two large blue petal limbs and their claws attaching them to the floral axis are visible; the smaller lower white petal is mostly obscured; the three yellow staminodes with central maroon spots are above, the central fertile stamen with maroon connective is below them, and the two brown lateral fertile stamens and the curving style between them are lowest; notice the contrasting veins on the spathe surrounding the flower.

There are often two cincinni present, though the upper, or distal, cincinnus may be vestigial. The lower, or proximal, cincinnus bears 1 to 4 bisexual flowers and is nearly included in the spathe, while the upper cincinnus has 1 to 2 male flowers and is about 8 mm (0.31 in) long. The individual flowers are subtended by bracteoles that fall off early in development. The pedicels supporting single flowers, and later the fruits, are erect initially but curve when in fruit. They measure about 3–4 mm (0.12–0.16 in). The 3 concave, membranous sepals are inconspicuous, but persist after the fruit develops; the lateral pair are fused basally, measure only 4.5–5 mm (0.18–0.20 in) long by 3–3.7 mm (0.12–0.15 in) wide, and are elliptic and glabrous. The lower sepal is lanceolate and about 4.5 mm (0.18 in) long by about 2.2 mm (0.087 in) wide. The 2 upper petals are blue to indigo in colour, while the much smaller lower petal is white. The upper two petals measure 9–10 mm (0.35–0.39 in) long by 8–10 mm (0.31–0.39 in) wide, while the lower petal is 5–6 mm (0.20–0.24 in) long by about 6 mm (0.24 in) wide. The 2 upper petals are composed of a claw about 3 mm (0.12 in) long and a broadly ovate limb with an acute apex and a cuneate-cordate base.

There are three anticous fertile stamens, meaning they are on the lower part of the flower, and three posticous infertile stamens, meaning they are on the upper part of the flower. These infertile stamens are termed staminodes. The fertile stamens are dimorphic: the lateral pair have maroon to indigo anthers that measure about 2 mm (0.079 in) long and are elliptic with a base that is sagittate or arrowhead-shaped. Their filaments are about 10–12 mm (0.39–0.47 in) long. The central fertile stamen has a yellow, elliptic anther with a maroon connective and a base that is hastate or spearhead-shaped, but with the lobes at right angles. The anther measures about 2.5 mm (0.098 in) long while its filament is about 5–6 mm (0.20–0.24 in) long. The three staminodes are all alike with yellow, cruciform, or cross-shaped, antherodes that are about 2 mm (0.079 in) long on filaments about 3 mm (0.12 in) long. Sometimes the antherodes will have a central maroon spot. Each antherode has two abortive lateral pollen sacks. The ovary is ellipsoid, about 2 mm (0.079 in) long and has a style that is about 1.3 cm (0.51 in) long.

The fruit is a dehiscent, ellipsoid capsule with two locules each containing two seeds. The capsule is glabrous, brown, measures 4.5–8 mm (0.18–0.31 in) long, and dehisces into two valves. The seeds are brown or brownish yellow in colour and deltoid, or roughly triangular in outline. They are dorsiventral, meaning they have distinct upper and lower surfaces, with the ventral, or lower, surface being planar and the dorsal, or upper, surface being convex. Seeds range in length from 2.5–4.2 mm (0.098–0.165 in), but seeds as short as 2 mm (0.079 in) can occur, while they are 2.2–3 mm (0.087–0.118 in) across. The surfaces are rugose pitted-reticulate and are densely covered with smaller farinose granules with sparse larger farinose granules.

== Taxonomy ==
Commelina communis was first described in 1753 by Carl Linnaeus in the first edition of his Species Plantarum, along with eight other species in the genus. The plant serves as the type species for the genus. The scientific name Commelina was chosen based on the Asiatic dayflower. Linnaeus picked the name in honour of the Dutch botanists Jan and Caspar Commelijn, using the two large showy petals of Commelina communis to symbolise them. A number of names given to plants thought to be different species have fallen into synonymy with the Asiatic dayflower. Albrecht Wilhelm Roth created the first such synonym, Commelina polygama, in 1790. Wenceslas Bojer described what he believed were two new species, Commelina barabata and Commelina salicifolia, in his work Hortus Mauritianus, both of which were quickly found to be identical to C. communis. Karl Sigismund Kunth created the synonym Commelina willdenowii in 1841. Finally, Korean populations of the species were named under the synonym Commelina coreana in 1910 by Augustin Abel Hector Léveillé.

Several varieties have also been named. Commelina communis var. ludens was created by C.B. Clarke after demoting it from the full species status in which it was placed by Friedrich Anton Wilhelm Miquel in 1861. The variety is distinguished by its darker flowers, antherodes with central maroon spots, less well developed distal cymes that usually do not produce a flower, and spathes that are proportionally broader. Jisaburo Ohwi's Flora of Japan also treats the variety as geographically distinct, stating that it is restricted to mountainous areas. This variety is still accepted by some workers, but others, such Robert B. Faden, consider it impossible to consistently separate from the type variety. Another variety, C. communis var. hortensis, which was named by Tomitaro Makino and is apparently a cultivated variety which originated from C. communis var. ludens in Japan, is also accepted by some botanists. It differs in having larger showy flowers which are used to produce a dye (see "Uses" section below). A variegated form called C. communis var. ludens f. aureostriata named by Frank C. MacKeever in 1961 is known to occur randomly throughout much of the species' range.

== Distribution and habitat ==
The plant's native distribution includes much of East Asia and Southeast Asia. Country by country, it is found in China, Taiwan, Japan, Korea, the Russian Far East, Cambodia, Laos, Malaysia, Thailand, India, Iran and Vietnam. Within China it is found in all provinces except Qinghai, Hainan, Xinjiang, and Tibet. In Japan the plant is found throughout the bulk of the country from Hokkaido south to Kyūshū. In Russia the Asiatic dayflower is found naturally on Sakhalin as well as in the Far East in areas surrounding the Ussuri River.

The species has been introduced to much of Europe and eastern North America. On the former continent it is now found from Central Europe well into western Russia. Specifically it is known from Italy north to Switzerland, east through the region encompassing the former Yugoslavia, east into the regions around the Black Sea including Romania, the Moldavia Region, and Ukraine but excluding Crimea, north through the Dnieper Basin into Belarus and Russia, continuing east into the regions surrounding the Don River and the Volga River south to their intersection at the Volga–Don Canal and north to the regions around Lake Ladoga and Lake Ilmen, and farther east to the regions of the Ural River and the Kama River. It is also found in the Czech Republic and Slovakia. It is present in the provinces of Ontario and Quebec in Canada, and in most of the eastern and central American states from Massachusetts and New York state in the northeast, west to Minnesota and south through the Great Plains to Texas and east to Florida in the United States.

Within its native distribution, the plant is most typical of moist, open places, including shady forest edges and wet areas of crop fields, orchards, ditches, and roadsides. In Taiwan, it can be found from 350 to 2,400 m (1,150 to 7,870 ft) elevation. In areas where the Asiatic dayflower is an introduced weed it is most common in waste places, but also along the edges of fields, woods, and marshes, and occasionally penetrating into woods.

== Ecology ==
The Asiatic dayflower is considered an invasive weed in many areas where it has been introduced. In the United States, the Virginia Department of Conservation and Recreation, for example, categorises the species as "occasionally invasive" in its Invasive Plant Species of Virginia. This means that the plant will "not affect ecosystem processes, but may alter plant community composition by outcompeting one or more native plant species". The species is typically limited to disturbed sites, whence it spreads relatively slowly. Within its native range in China it is also sometimes considered a pest, especially in the northeast of the country where it has caused economically significant agricultural damage in orchards.

The Asiatic dayflower has been used in pollination studies concerning the behaviour of plants in relation to their pollinators. One important experiment tested the hypotheses that floral guides (i.e. various patterns and colours on anthers and petals) simultaneously promote pollinator visitation and prevent visits where the pollinator fails to come into contact with the stigma or anthers, termed pollen theft. As the flowers of the Asiatic dayflower lack nectar, they offer only pollen as a reward to their visitors. To attract pollinators, the plant has three types of brightly colored floral organs: the large blue petals, fertile yellow anthers, and infertile yellow antherodes that lack pollen. When the infertile antherodes were experimentally removed in natural populations, the number of total floral visitor landings was reduced, supporting the hypothesis that these infertile anthers essentially trick their pollinators into believing they offer more than they actually do. When the central, bright yellow fertile anther was removed, leaving only two brown fertile anthers, the frequency of legitimate flower landings decreased, meaning that the visitors were not pollinating the flowers, suggesting that floral signals also prevent "theft", or visits where the pollinators take pollen, but do not place any on the stigma. Thus both the fertile anthers and the infertile antherodes were shown to play an important role in both increasing visitor landings and orienting floral visitors toward a landing point appropriate for pollination.

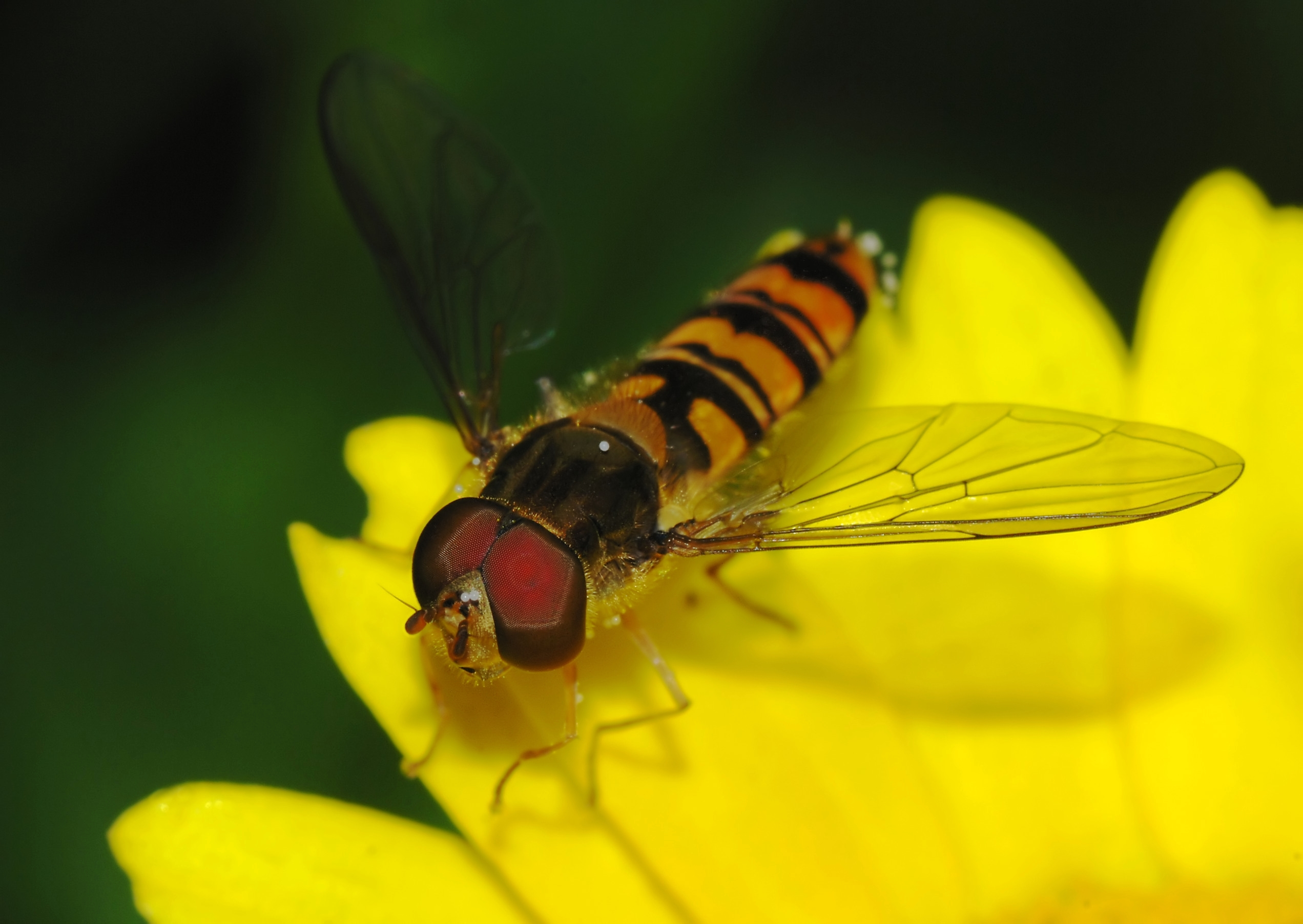
A male syrphid fly, Episyrphus balteatus, the most common pollinator of the Asiatic dayflower in much of its range

Recent studies have shown that wild Asiatic dayflower populations found growing on copper mine spoils in eastern China exhibited very high concentrations of copper within the plants, the highest in the 48 species tested. Commelina communis had sequestered some 361 mg/kg of copper, while the plant with the next highest concentration, Polygonum macrathum, had 286 mg/kg. Five of the species examined, including the Asiatic dayflower, also showed high concentrations of other metals such as zinc, lead, and cadmium. The results suggest that the Asiatic dayflower is a good candidate for copper mine spoil revegetation and phytoremediation.

Ten species of fungi have been found on the Asiatic dayflower, four of which can infect the plant, while 12 species of insects are known to be associated with it. Two of the fungi, Kordyana commelinae and Phyllosticta commelinicola, are thought to be host specific with the Asiatic dayflower. Of the ten fungi seven are Basidiomycota and three are Ascomycota. Nine of the 12 insects associated with the plant are beetles, seven of which are in the genus Lema, while the other two are in the families Hispidae and Pentatomidae. The remaining three insects include one species of moth, Pergesa acteus, and two true bugs, namely Aphis commilinae and Aeschrocoris ceylonicus. Important pollinators include the Asian honeybee, Apis cerana, syrphid fly, Episyrphus balteatus, and the bumble bee species Bombus diversus.

== Uses ==
=== Medicine and food ===
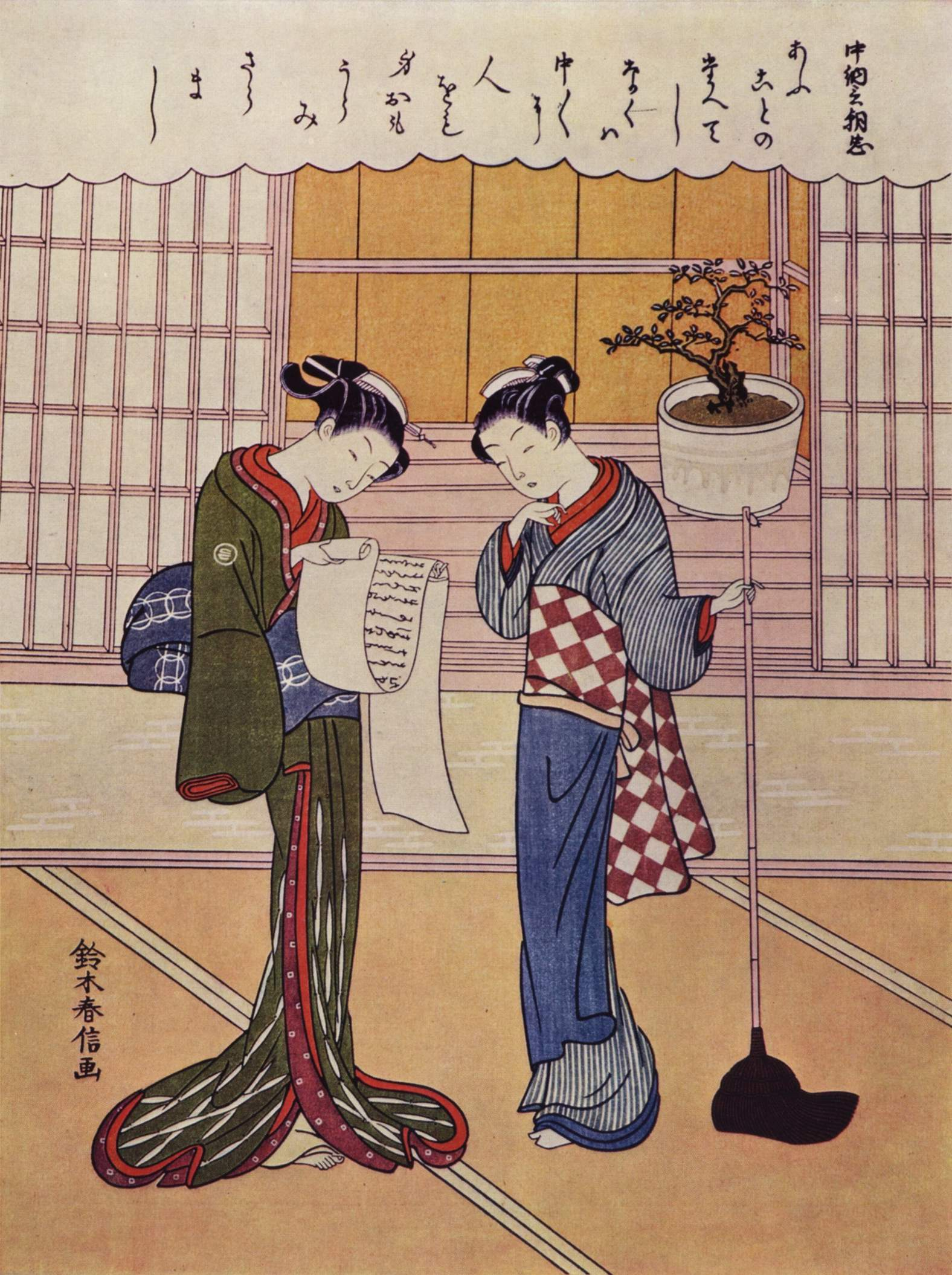
Ukiyo-e woodcut by Suzuki Harunobu; the blue pigment used on the kimono is believed to be aigami made from petals of the Asiatic dayflower; the alternative would be ai derived from Polygonum tinctorum

In China it is used as a medicinal herb with febrifugal, antipyretic, anti-inflammatory, and diuretic effects. Additionally, it is also used for treating sore throats and tonsillitis. Recent pharmacological investigations have revealed that the Asiatic dayflower contains at least five active compounds. One of these, p-hydroxycinnamic acid, shows antibacterial activity, while another, D-mannitol, has an antitussive effect. In China and India the plant is also used as a vegetable and fodder crop.

=== Pigment and dye ===
In Japan there is a sizeable dye industry devoted to the plant. The purported variety Commelina communis var. hortensis, which is apparently a cultivated form of another putative variety, namely Commelina communis var. ludens, is grown for its larger petals which yield a blue juice used in manufacturing a paper called boshigami or aigami (藍 紙), which is the famous product of the Yamada village in the Shiga prefecture. The paper is usually resoaked, allowing the pigment to be reabsorbed in water for use as a dye. The dye, also referred to as aigami, but also as aobanagami (青 花 紙) or tsuyukusairo (露草色), is composed primarily of malonyl awobanin and was used extensively as a colorant in 18th and 19th century woodblock prints in Japan, especially during the early Ukiyo-e era. The colorant is known to have been used by several famous Ukiyo-e artists such as Torii Kiyonaga. However, aigami fades to a greenish yellow in a matter of months when exposed to sunlight. As a result, the color was eventually replaced by imported Prussian blue, a much more stable colour with its first commercial appearance in 1829 in the work of Keisai Eisen. The plant is also grown for its dye in northern China. Additional uses of the colourant include making preparatory designs on cloth before dyeing with other pigments.

Commelinin, the blue pigment from the flowers of C. communis, is a metalloanthocyanin. It is a complex of 4 Mg^{2+} ions chelating six anthocyanin molecules.

=== Plant physiology and development ===
Commelina communis is also used as a model organism in plant physiology and plant development to a limited extent, especially in relation to stomatal physiology and the biology of pigmentation development. For example, the blue pigmentation of Asiatic dayflower petals was shown to consist of a large complex of six anthocyanins, six flavones, and two associated magnesium ions, demonstrating that supramolecular complexes of several copigments and chelated metals often determine colour. Other research on the plant has helped to explain photoreceptor systems in plants such as their stomatal responses to blue light versus red light spectrums, abscisic acid perception and its role in cell signaling, particularly concerning the chemical's role in stomatal function, the role of vanadates in inhibiting stomatal opening, and the necessity of calcium in stomatal closure, among other topics. Its widespread use in stomatal studies is due to the fact that the leaves produce exceptional epidermal peels that are consistently one cell layer thick. This same quality makes the plant popular for use in laboratory exercises in higher education for demonstrating stomatal function and morphology. Guard cell turgor pressure and its regulation in the opening and closing of stomata is particularly easy to demonstrate with the Asiatic dayflower.
