= Episyrphus petilis =

Scientific classification
- Kingdom: Animalia
- Phylum: Arthropoda
- Class: Insecta
- Order: Diptera
- Family: Syrphidae
- Genus: Episyrphus
- Species: E. petilis

Binomial name
- Episyrphus petilis (Vockeroth, 1973)

Species of hoverfly

Episyrphus petilis is a species of hoverfly first recorded in mountain forest habitats of Mozambique, and in South Africa. It has a slender, mostly yellow body, with abdomen sides almost parallel. Males and females are very similar.
