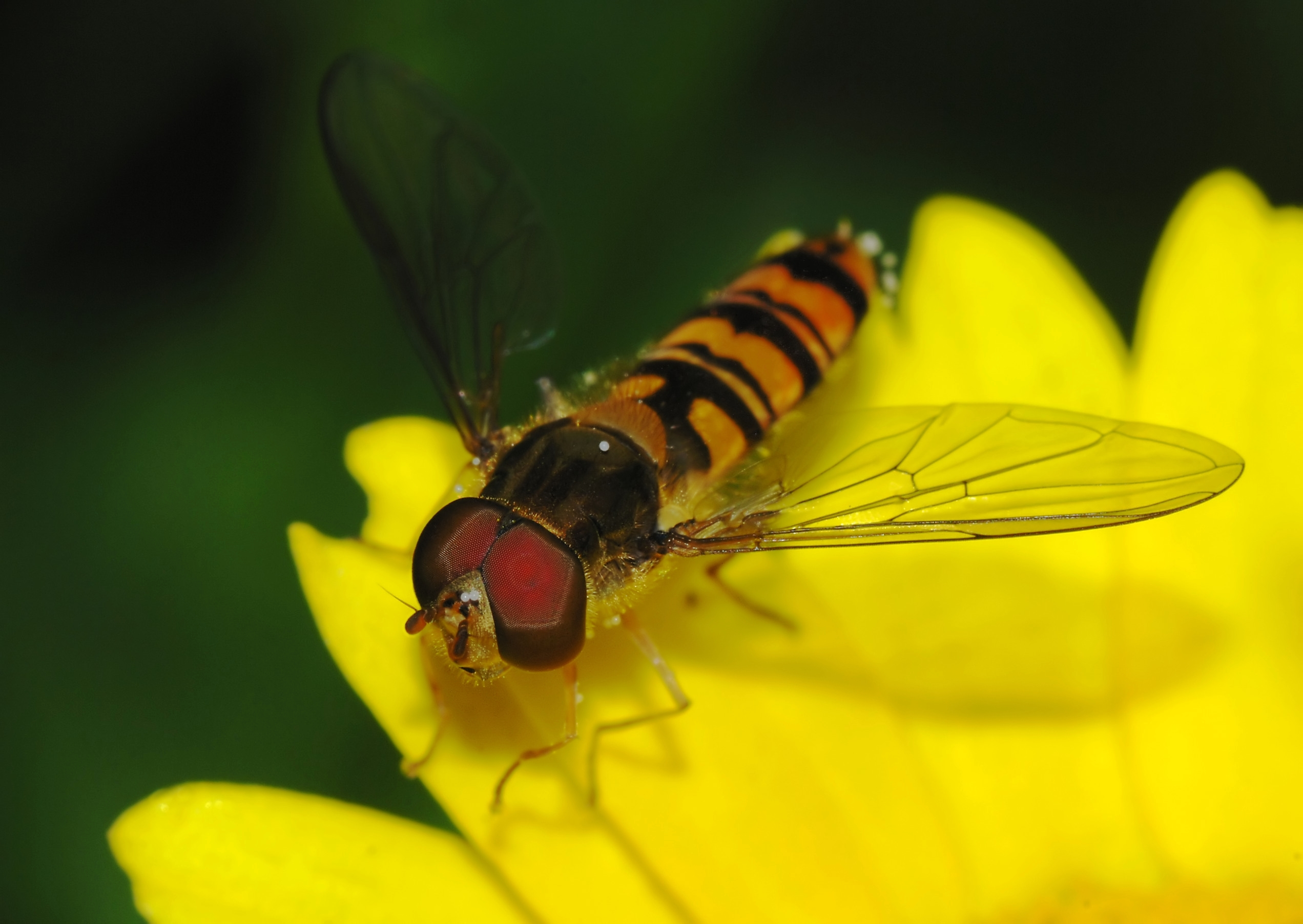
- male Episyrphus balteatus

Scientific classification
- Kingdom: Animalia
- Phylum: Arthropoda
- Class: Insecta
- Order: Diptera
- Family: Syrphidae
- Tribe: Syrphini
- Genus: Episyrphus; Matsumura & Adachi, 1917

Type species
- Musca balteata De Geer, 1776

= Episyrphus =

Genus of flies

Episyrphus is a genus of hoverflies in the subfamily Syrphinae. Larvae are predatory, often on aphids.

Two subgenera are recognized, Episyrphus and Asiobaccha. Species of the latter are distinguished by a petiolate abdomen.

It has been claimed that classification within the genus Episyrphus needs revision, due to the poor clarity of species names and distinguishing characteristics between them. Characters such as the colors on the abdomen or of the pile on the frons and scutellum, often taken as diagnostic, have been found to depend on temperature in studies on E. viridaureus.

== Species ==
- E. arcifer (Sack, 1927)
- E. balteatus (De Geer, 1776)
- E. canaqueus (Bigot, 1884)
- E. circularis Hull, 1941
- E. contax (Curran, 1947)
- E. contractus (Keiser, 1952)
- E. demeijerei (Curran, 1947)
- E. divertens (Walker, 1856)
- E. flavibasis Keiser, 1971
- E. fuscicolor (Bigot, 1884)
- E. glaber (Wright, 2013)
- E. insularis (Kassebeer, 2000)
- E. nigromarginatus (Vockeroth, 1973)
- E. noumeae (Bigot, 1884)
- E. obligatus (Curran, 1931)
- E. oliviae (Wright, 2013)
- E. perscitus (He & Chu, 1992)
- E. petilis (Vockeroth, 1973)
- E. schultzianus (Bezzi, 1908)
- E. stuckenbergi (Doesburg, 1957)
- E. trisectus (Loew, 1858)
- E. viridaureus (Wiedemann, 1824)
- E. virtuosa
