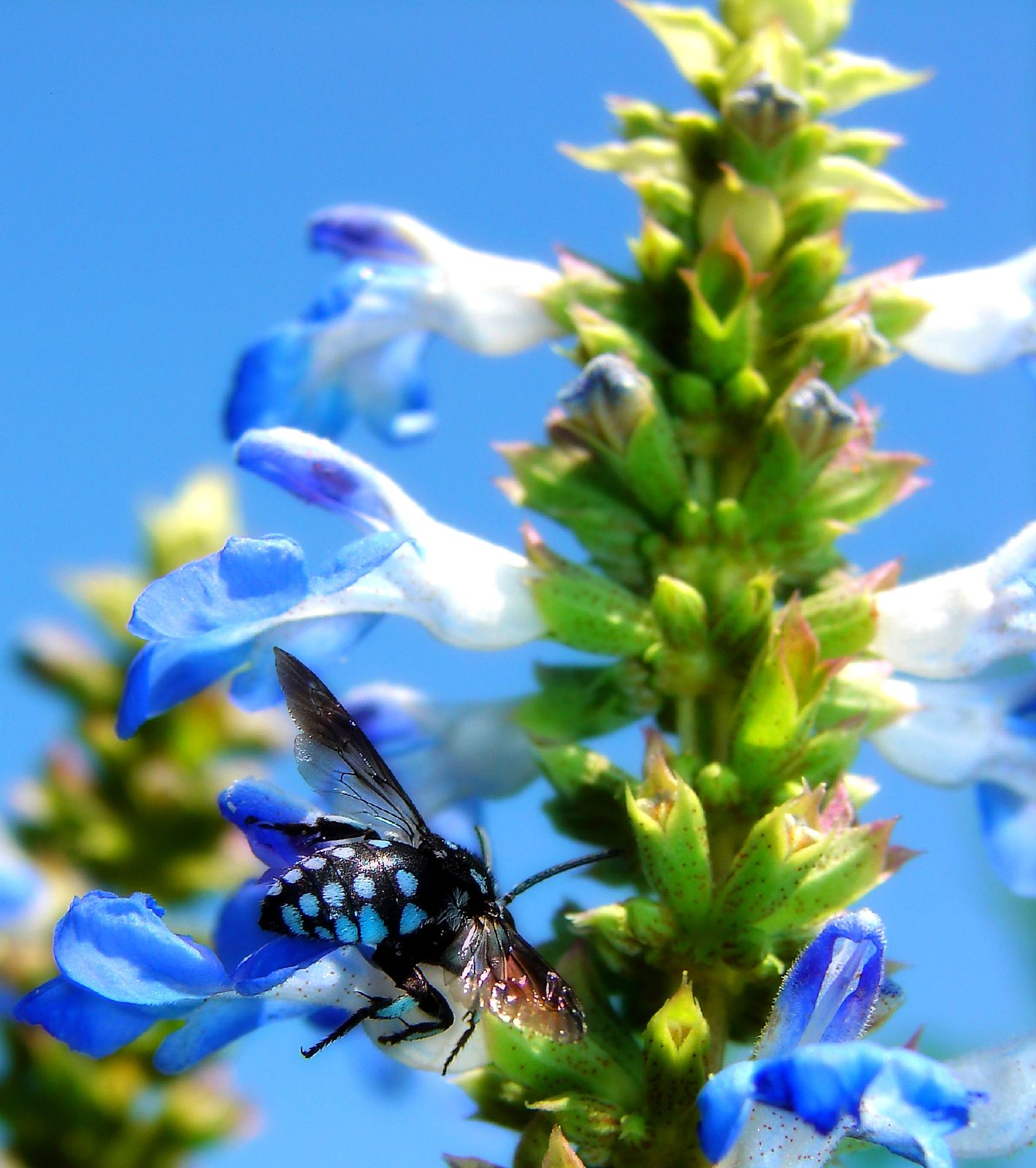

Scientific classification
- Kingdom: Plantae
- Clade: Tracheophytes
- Clade: Angiosperms
- Clade: Eudicots
- Clade: Asterids
- Order: Lamiales
- Family: Lamiaceae
- Genus: Salvia
- Species: S. uliginosa

Binomial name
- Salvia uliginosa Benth.

= Salvia uliginosa =

Species of flowering plant

The plant known as Salvia uliginosa, the bog sage, is a species of flowering plant in the family Lamiaceae, native to southern Brazil, Uruguay, and Argentina. It was described and named by botanist George Bentham for its typical habitat "of swamps and marshes", or uliginosa.

== Description ==
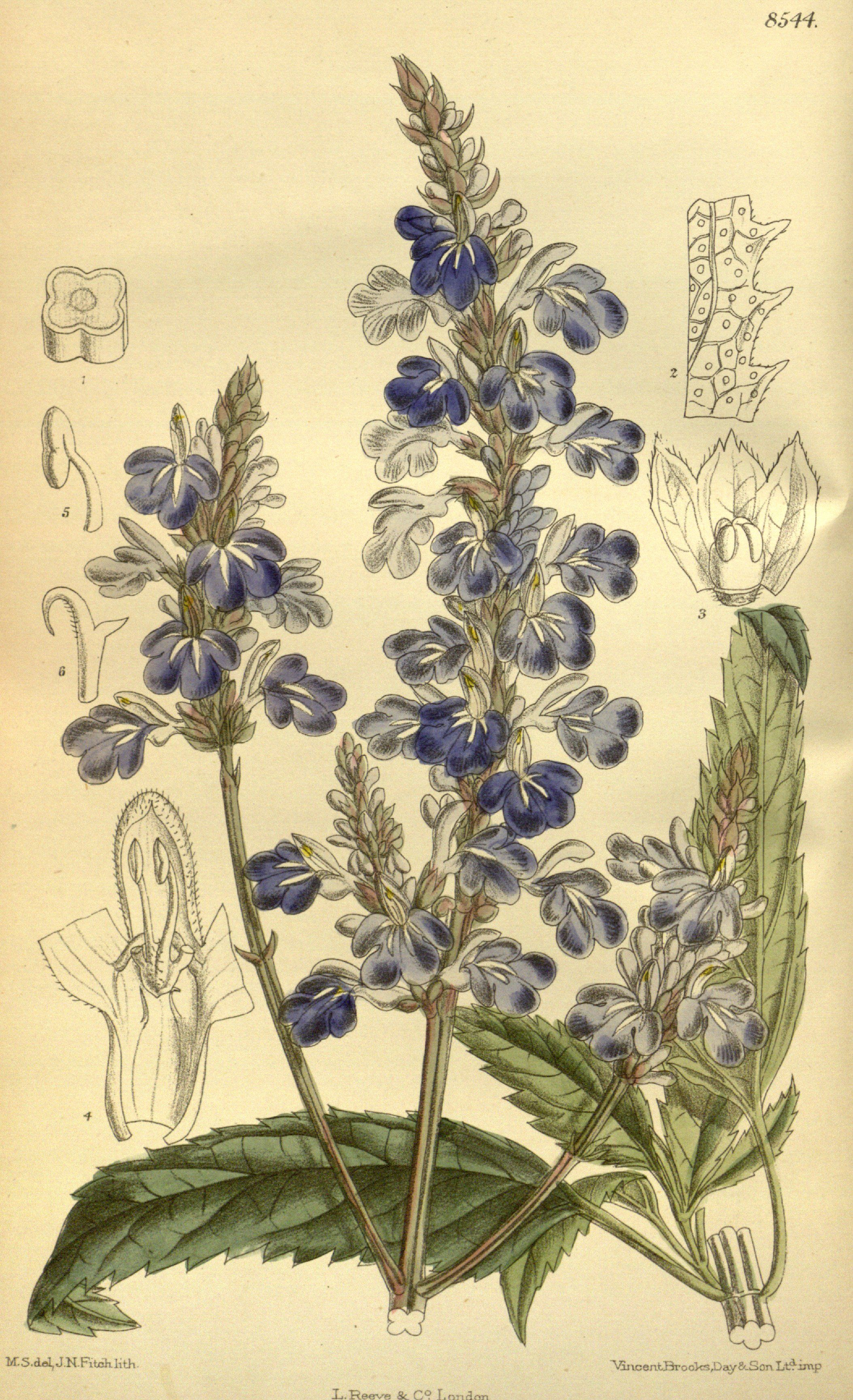
Botanical illustration of Salvia uliginosa from Curtis's Botanical Magazine, 1914

Salvia uliginosa is an herbaceous perennial growing up to 3 to 6 feet (0.91 to 1.83 m) tall in one season, with multiple thin stems and yellow-green lance-shaped leaves that have serrated edges. The plant quickly spreads on underground runners and is readily divided.

The bright azure-blue flowers are .5 inches (1.3 cm) long with a white beeline in the throat pointing toward the nectar and pollen. They grow in whorls beginning in summer until fall, with many flowers coming into bloom at the same time.

Cyanosalvianin, the blue pigment from the flowers of S. uliginosa, is a metalloanthocyanin, a complex formed of six molecules of the anthocyanin type, six molecules of the flavone type and two magnesium ions.

== Cultivation ==
Salvia uliginosa was introduced into horticulture in 1912, and has become popular in gardens and public landscapes for its azure-blue flowers, ability to grow under various conditions, and its pollinator habitat attributes.

This plant has gained the Royal Horticultural Society's Award of Garden Merit.
