= Metalloanthocyanin =

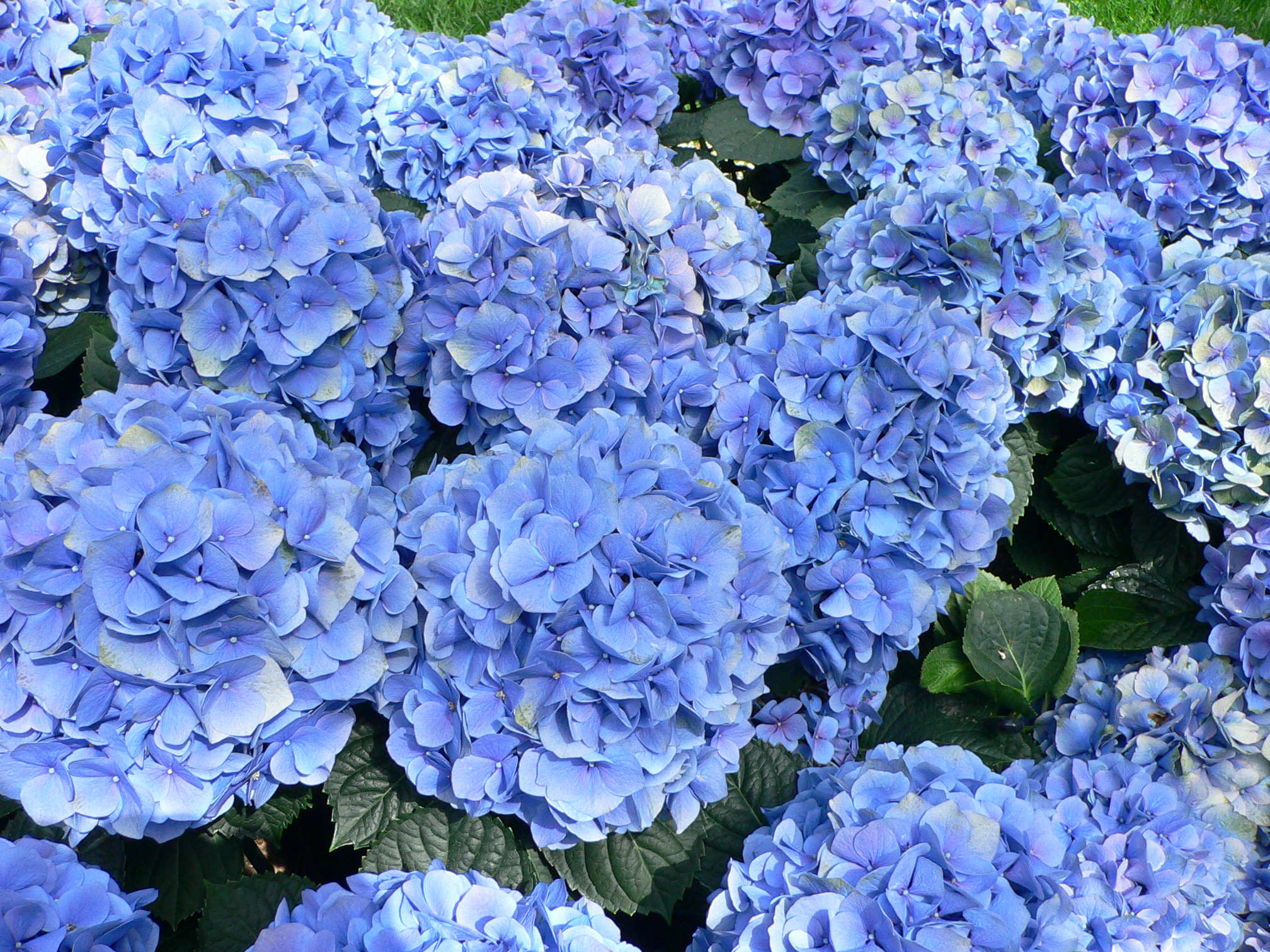
Blue color inflorescences of Hydrangea macrophylla

A metalloanthocyanin is a chemical complex giving color to petals of certain plants.

These complexes are self-assembled, supramolecular metal complex pigment composed of stoichiometric amounts of anthocyanins, flavones, and metal ions. The various colors, such as red, mauve, purple, violet and blue, in Hydrangea macrophylla are developed from one simple anthocyanin, delphinidin 3-glucoside forming complexes with metal ions.

== Examples ==
Commelinin, a blue pigment from the flowers of Commelina communis, is a complex of 4 Mg^{2+} ions chelating six anthocyanin molecules.

Cyanosalvianin, a blue pigment from the flowers of Salvia uliginosa, is a complex formed of six molecules of the anthocyanin type, six molecules of the flavone type and two magnesium ions.
