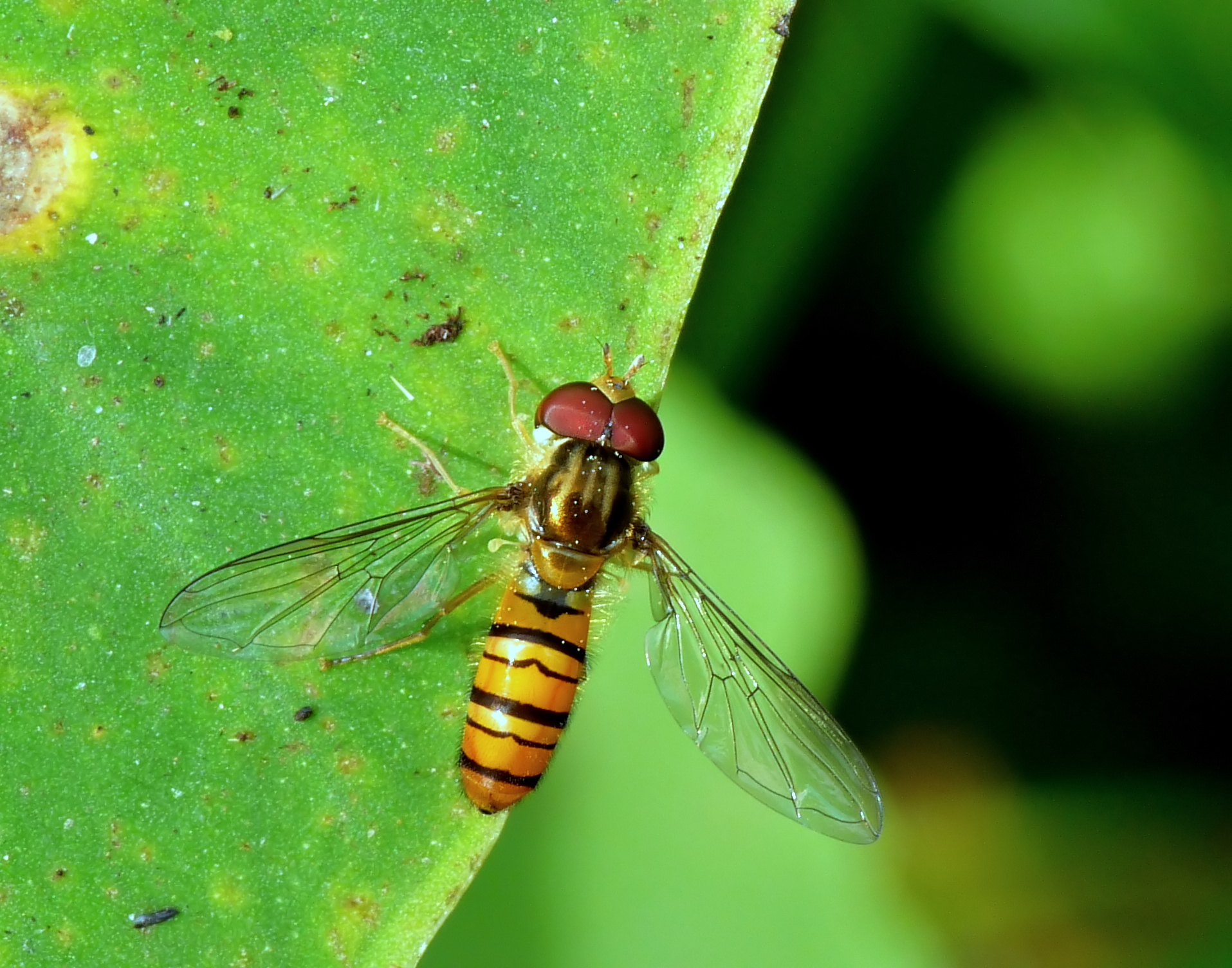

Scientific classification
- Kingdom: Animalia
- Phylum: Arthropoda
- Class: Insecta
- Order: Diptera
- Family: Syrphidae
- Genus: Episyrphus
- Species: E. viridaureus

Binomial name
- Episyrphus viridaureus (Wiedemann, 1824)

= Episyrphus viridaureus =

Species of fly

Episyrphus viridaureus is a species of hoverfly.

== Morphology ==
This hoverfly has orange yellow body with narrow dark bands at the abdomen. The upper side of the thorax covered with black metallic shield and the rest is covered with orange-yellow hair. Between the dark purple eyes is a metallic blue part at the forehead. Its size is up to 35 mm, typically 10–20 mm.

The coloration of the abdomen is markedly temperature-dependent, with anterior and posterior bands thicker when pupae were reared at 15° instead than 25°. Conversely, colour of antennae, marking on the lunule, extent of microtrichia on the alula, sternal markings and «the 'theme' of abdominal patterns» are independent from temperature.

== Range ==
It occurs on the east coast of Australia, where it is the most frequently collected Episyrphus species, from the Iron Range in northern Queensland up to south of Sydney; it also occurs in Malaysia, Indonesia and New Caledonia and, according to GBIF, also in India and southeast Asia.

== Biology ==
E. viridaureus lives comfortably in disturbed or suburban environments. Females lay eggs often on plants such as Ageratum houstonianum and Sonchus oleraceus.

As for other Episyrphus species, larvae are aphid eaters; species often predated are Brachybaudus helichrysi, Hypermyzus lactucae, Toxoptera citricidus, Aphis nerii and Aphis gossypii.
