= Episyrphus arcifer =

Scientific classification
- Kingdom: Animalia
- Phylum: Arthropoda
- Class: Insecta
- Order: Diptera
- Family: Syrphidae
- Genus: Episyrphus
- Species: E. arcifer

Binomial name
- Episyrphus arcifer (Sack, 1927)

Species of hoverfly

Episyrphus arcifer is a species of hoverfly. It is recorded from Nepal, peninsular Malaysia and Taiwan.

It has long wings and a distinct pattern of abdominal markings, more similar to Meliscaeva, that sets it apart from other Episyrphus species.
