= Episyrphus contax =

Scientific classification
- Domain: Eukaryota
- Kingdom: Animalia
- Phylum: Arthropoda
- Class: Insecta
- Order: Diptera
- Family: Syrphidae
- Genus: Episyrphus
- Species: E. contax

Binomial name
- Episyrphus contax (Curran, 1947)

Species of hoverfly

Episyrphus contax is a species of hoverfly, first described from Guadalcanal.
