= Episyrphus canaqueus =

Scientific classification
- Kingdom: Animalia
- Phylum: Arthropoda
- Class: Insecta
- Order: Diptera
- Family: Syrphidae
- Genus: Episyrphus
- Species: E. canaqueus

Binomial name
- Episyrphus canaqueus (Bigot, 1884)

Species of hoverfly

Episyrphus canaqueus is a species of hoverfly 9 mm long, first described from New Caledonia in the 19th century.
