= Episyrphus flavibasis =

Scientific classification
- Kingdom: Animalia
- Phylum: Arthropoda
- Class: Insecta
- Order: Diptera
- Family: Syrphidae
- Genus: Episyrphus
- Species: E. flavibasis

Binomial name
- Episyrphus flavibasis (Keiser, 1971)

Species of hoverfly

Episyrphus flavibasis is a species of hoverfly known from Madagascar and Comoro Islands.
