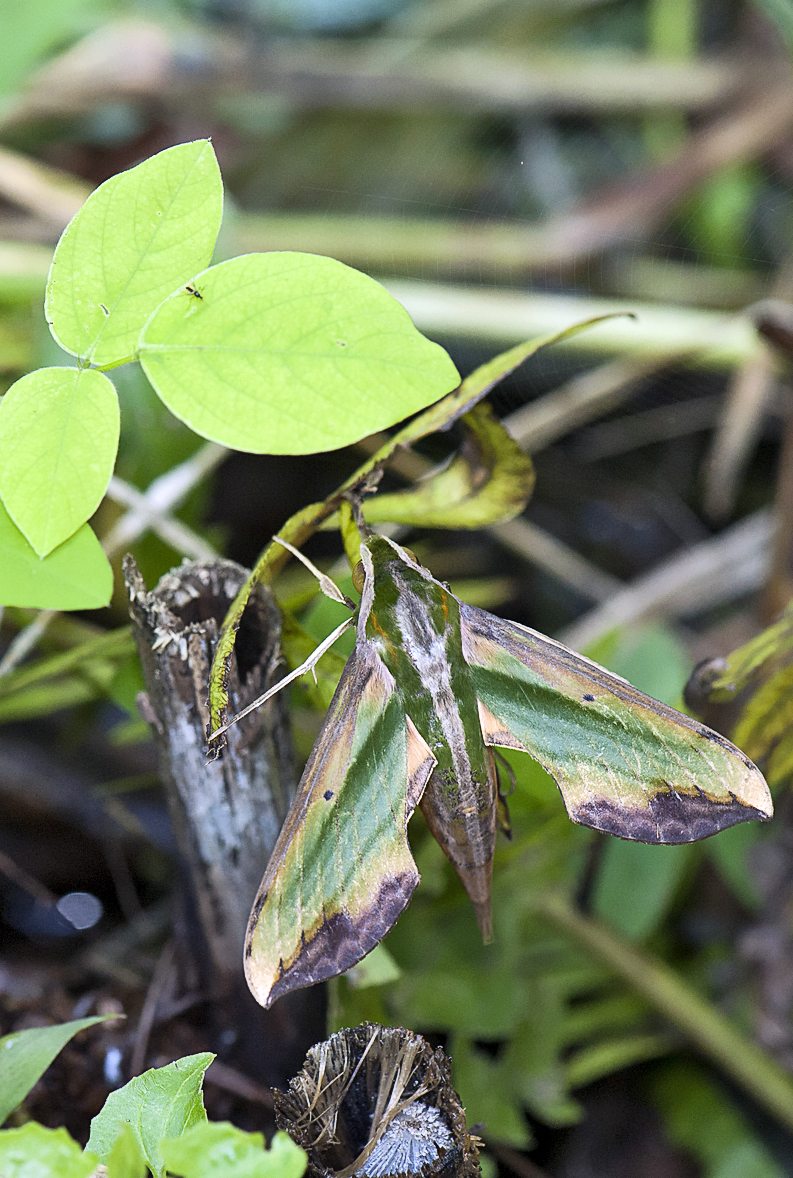

Scientific classification
- Kingdom: Animalia
- Phylum: Arthropoda
- Clade: Pancrustacea
- Class: Insecta
- Order: Lepidoptera
- Family: Sphingidae
- Subtribe: Choerocampina
- Genus: Pergesa; Walker, 1856
- Species: P. acteus

Binomial name
- Pergesa acteus (Cramer, 1779)

Synonyms
- Generic; Rhyncholaba Rothschild & Jordan, 1903; Specific; Sphinx acteus Cramer, 1779; Panacra butleri Rothschild, 1894

= Pergesa =

Green pergesa hawkmoth

Genus of moths

Pergesa is a monotypic genus of moth in the family Sphingidae first described by Francis Walker in 1856. Its only species, Pergesa acteus, the green pergesa hawkmoth, was described by Pieter Cramer in 1779.

== Distribution ==
It is found in Sri Lanka, India, Nepal, Myanmar, Thailand, eastern and southern China, Taiwan, Japan (the Ryukyu Archipelago), Peninsular Malaysia, Indonesia (Sumatra, Java, Sulawesi) and the Philippines.

== Description ==
The wingspan is 64–80 mm. Head, thorax and abdomen are purplish grey, which differs from Theretra nessus. Vertex of head and a dorso-lateral stripe to thorax and abdomen is green. Forewings are purplish grey with a green oblique central area from below apex to inner margin with some indistinct lines on it. There is an irregular dark outer area with some yellow inside it. Hindwings with anal patch and submarginal band are pointed.

Larvae are greenish with a dark dorsal line, and a subdorsal pale line on thoracic somites. The fourth somite has a large ocellus, which is white ringed with brown and centered with blue and green. The ocelli on the fifth to tenth somites are bluish with yellow centers. Lateral area is greenish and horn is yellowish. The caterpillars feed on Alocasia odora, Syngonium podophyllum, Amorphophallus, Arisaema, Caladium, Colocasia, Dieffenbachia, Begonia, Commelina, Leea, Cissus and Vitis species.

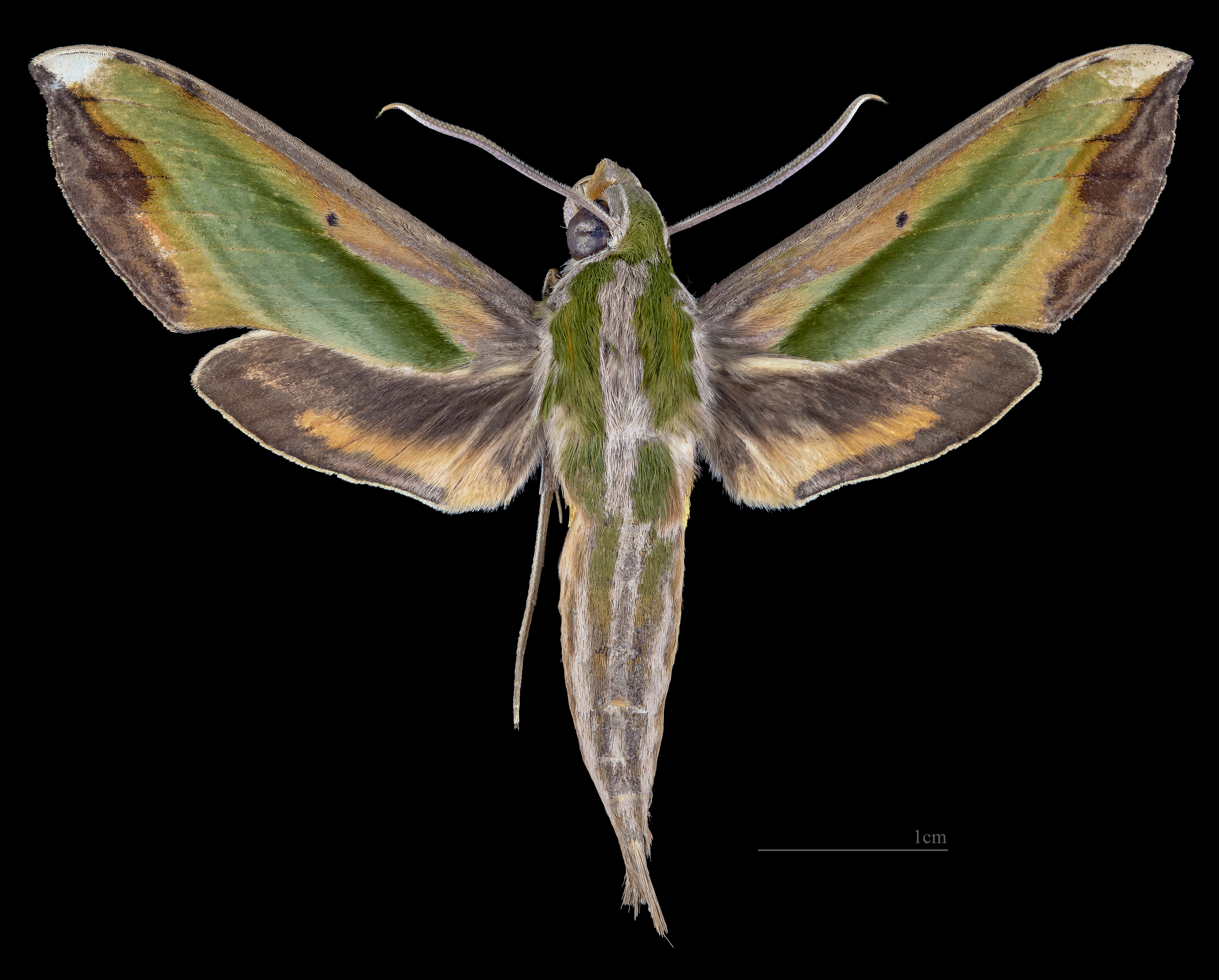
Male dorsal

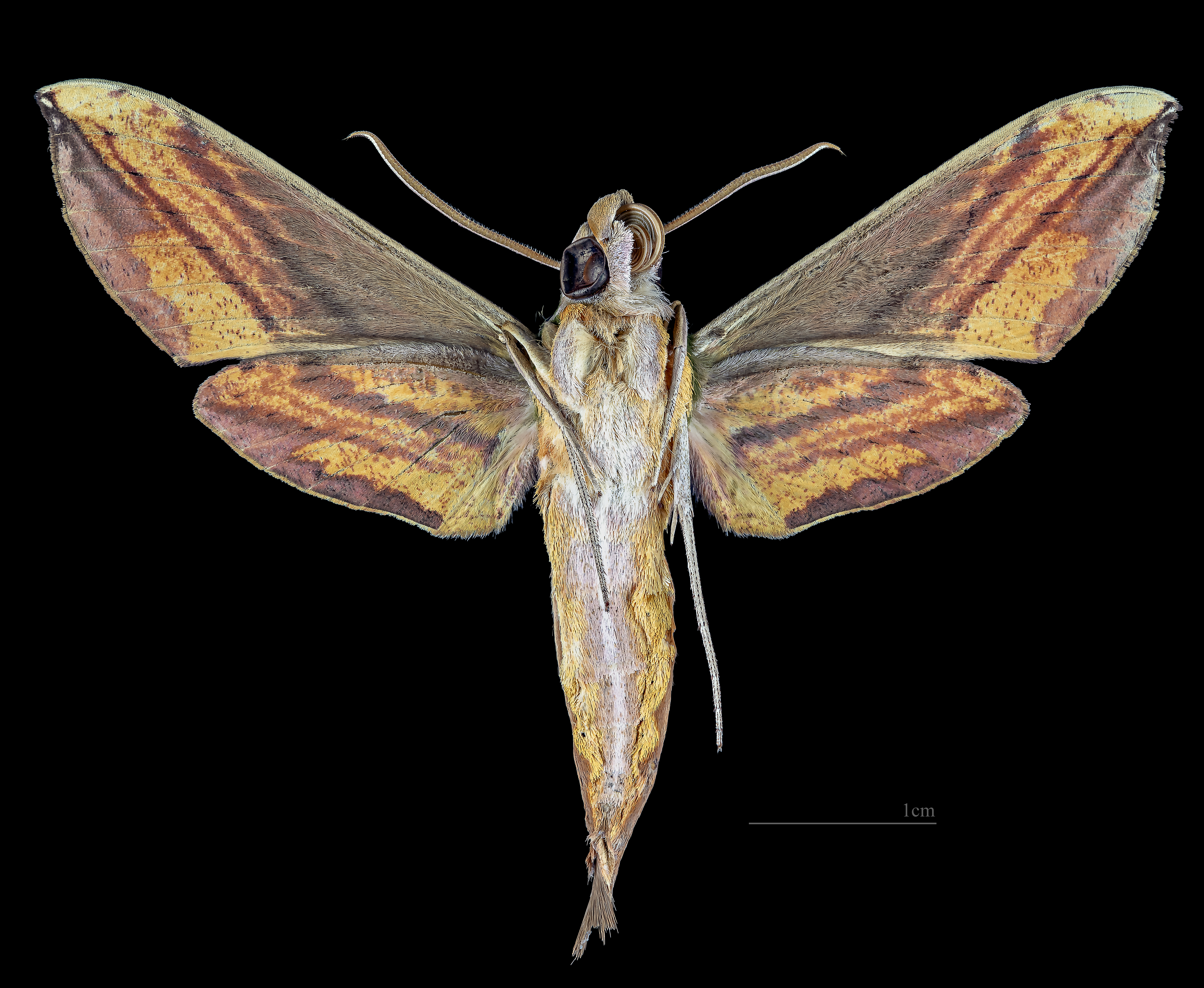
Male △ ventral

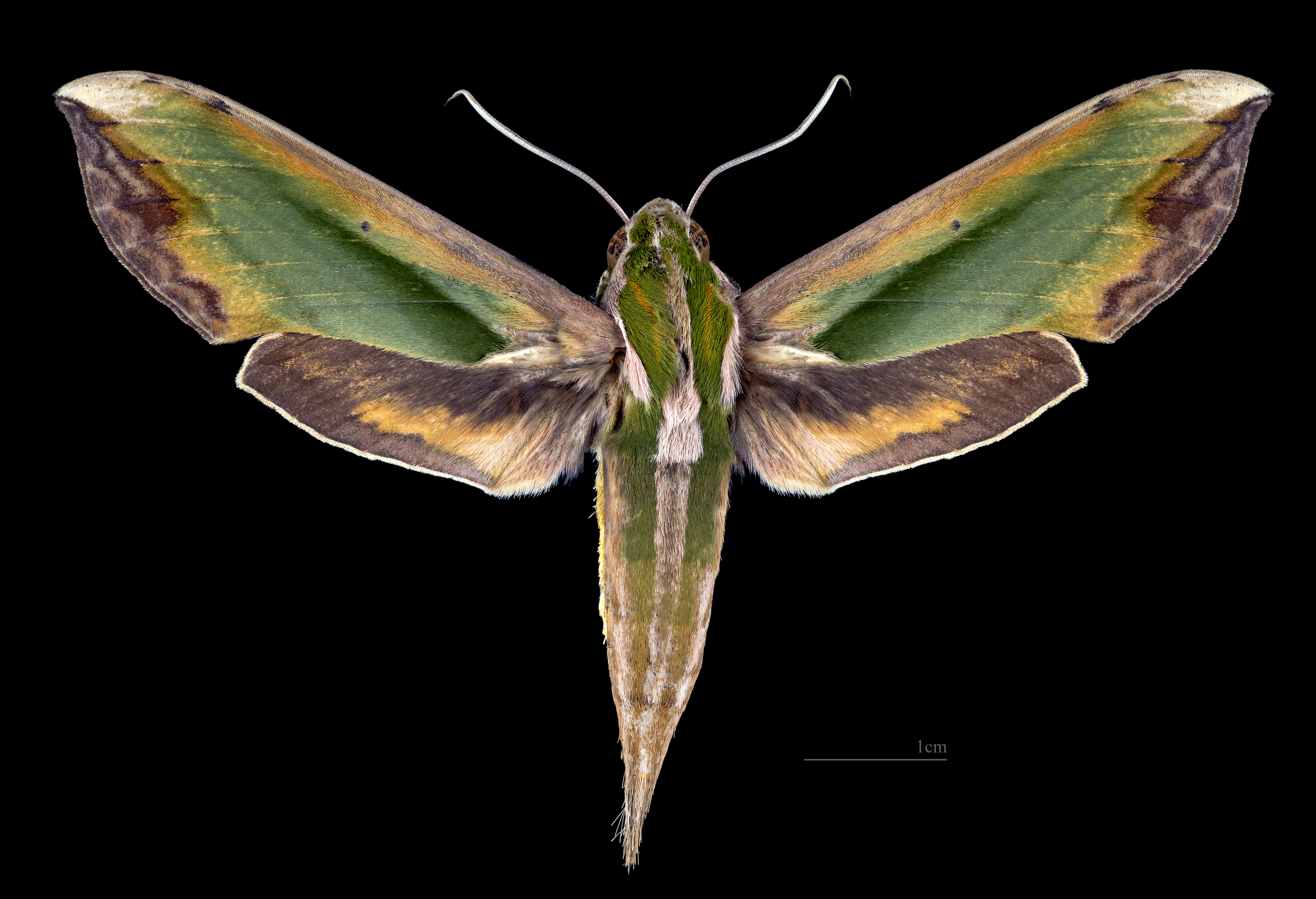
Female dorsal

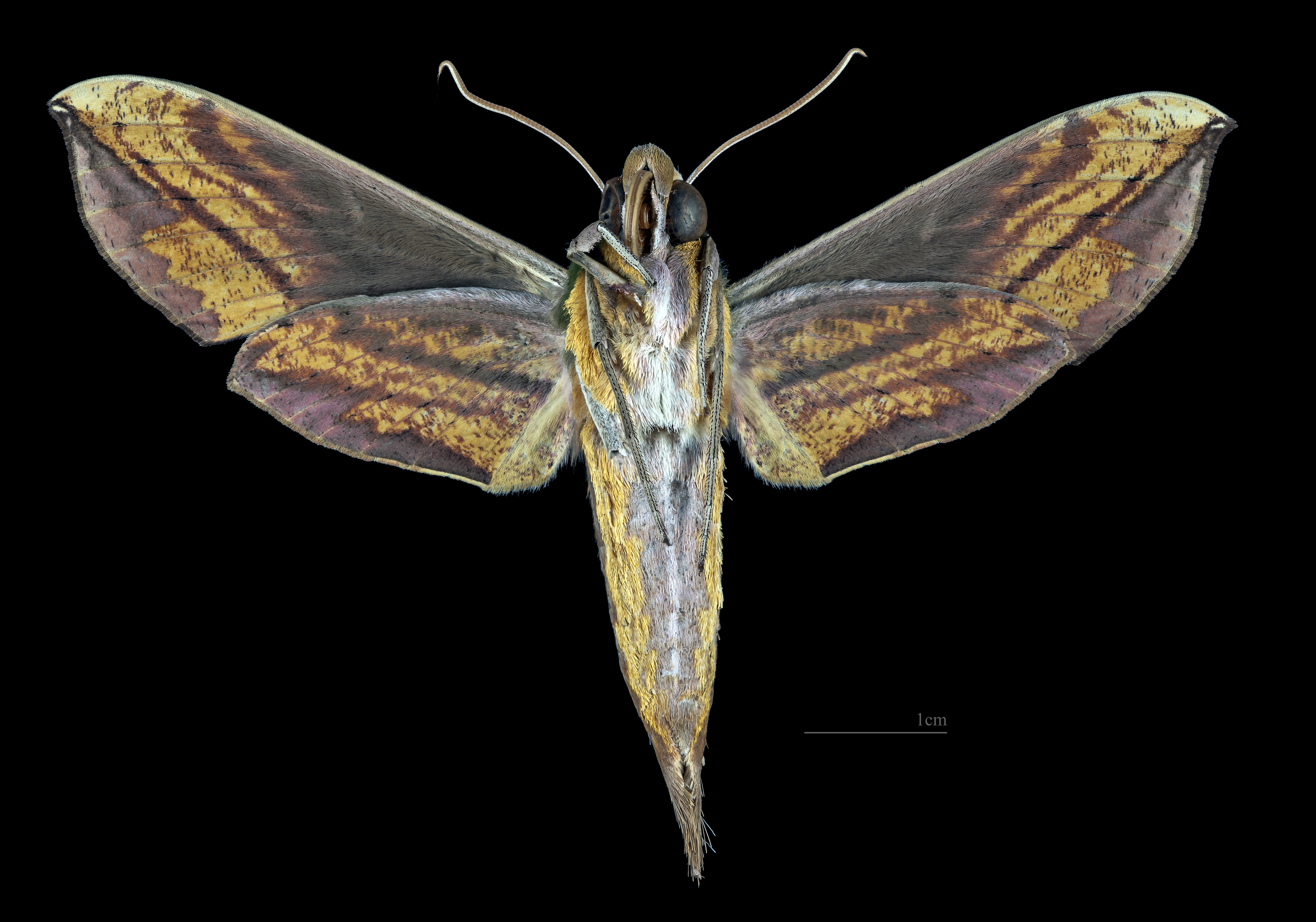
Female △ ventral
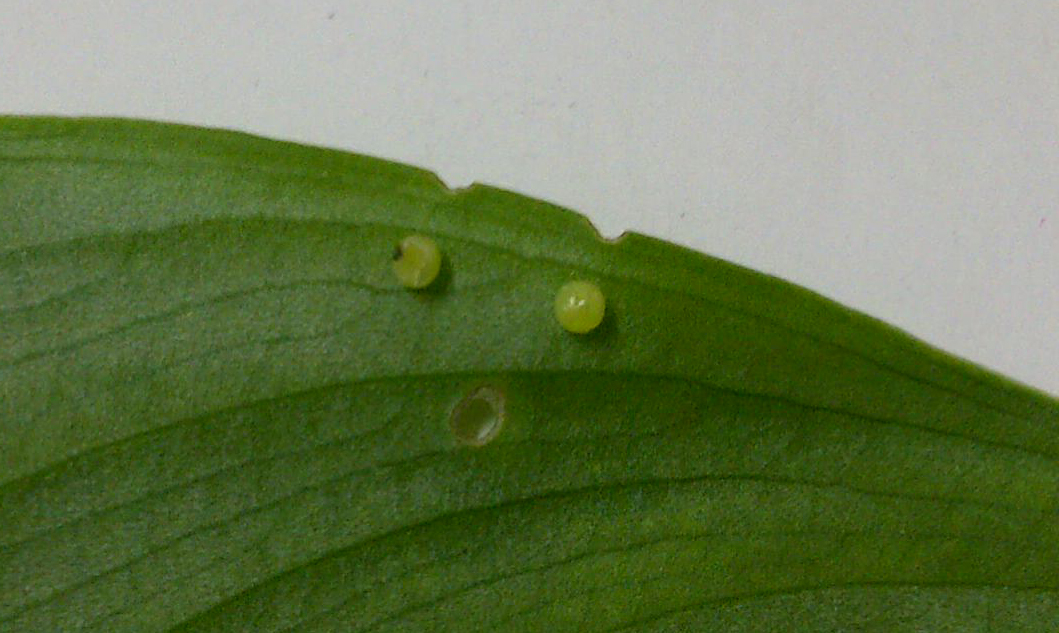
Eggs

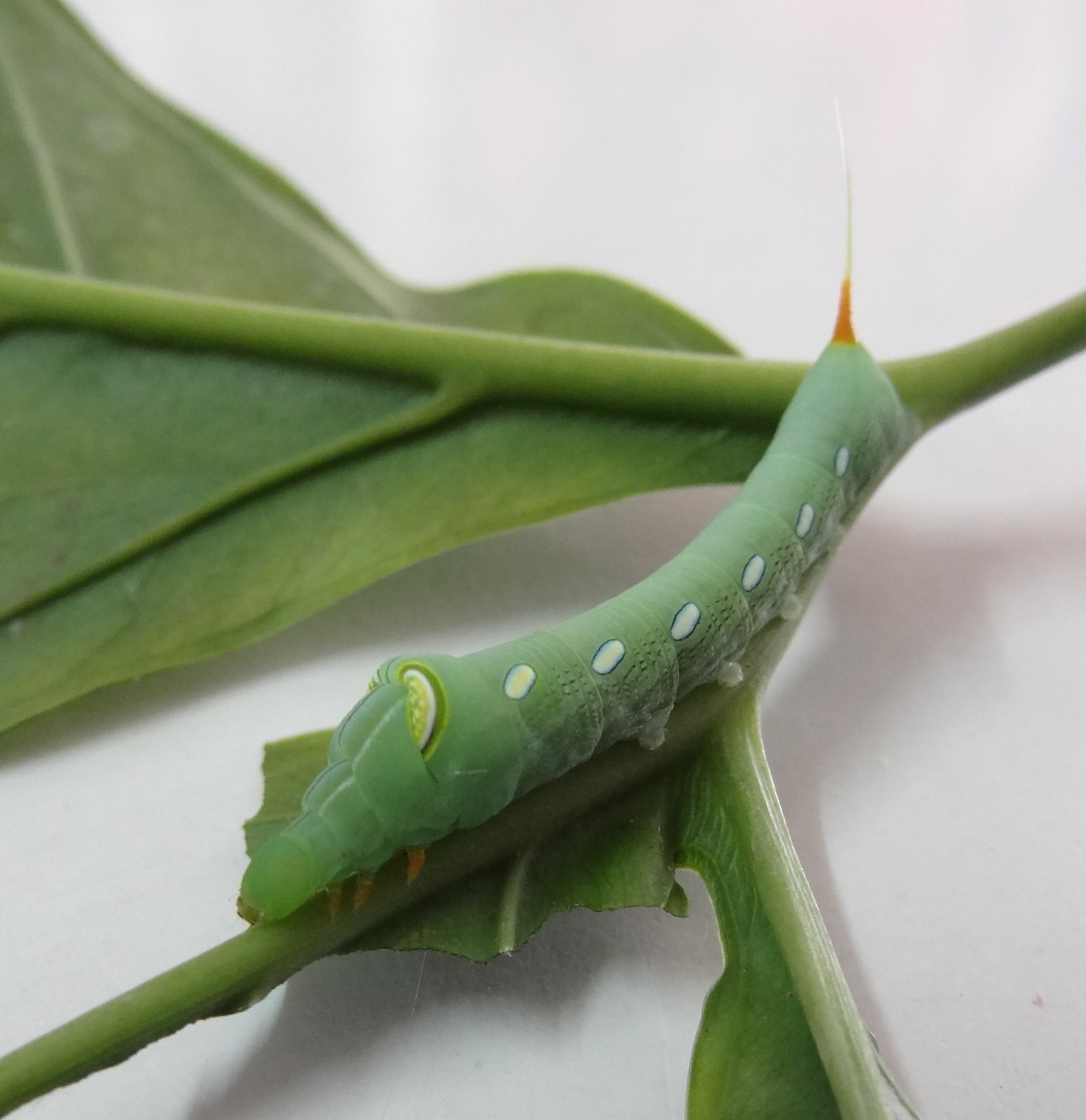
Caterpillar

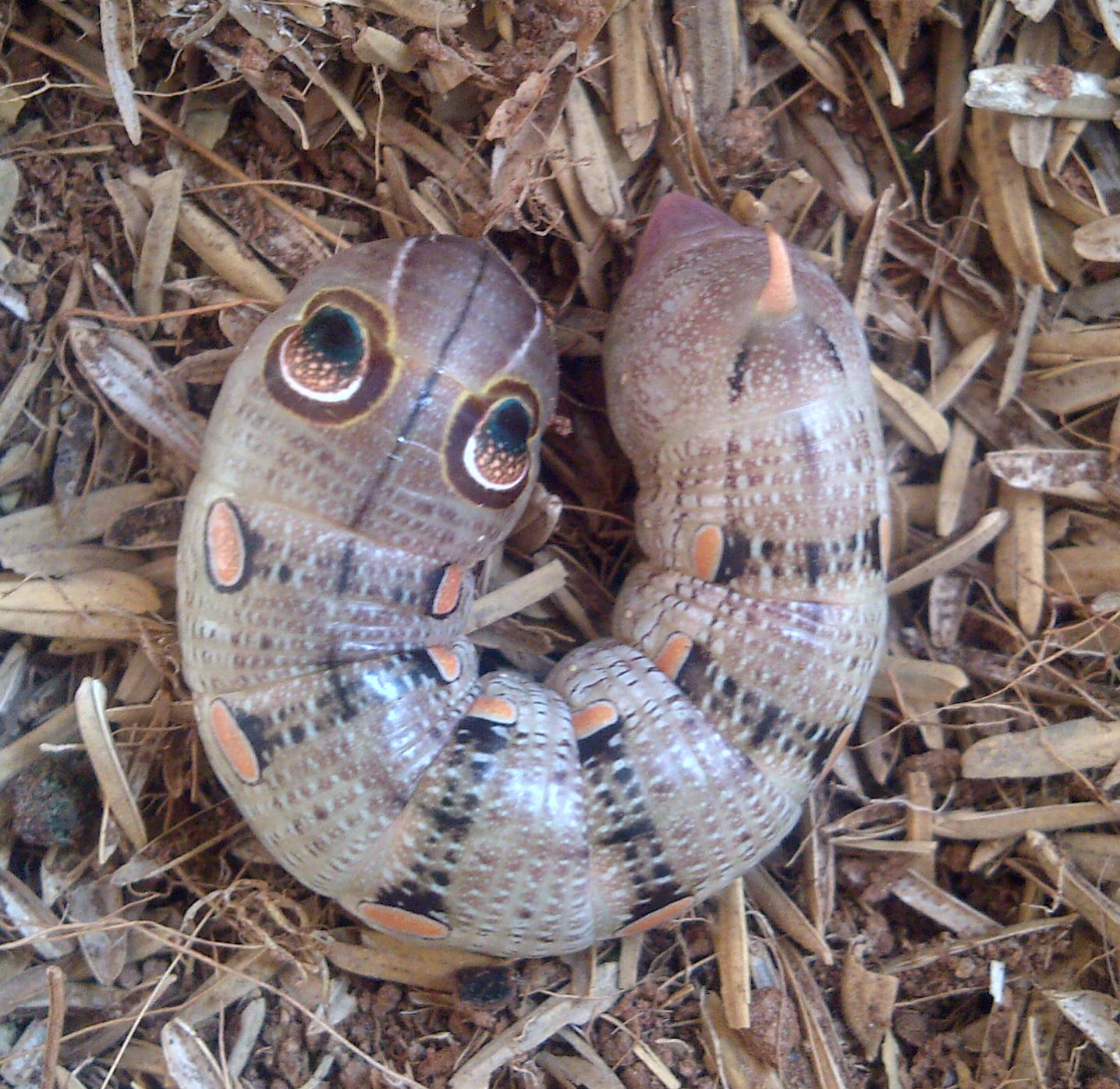
Caterpillar

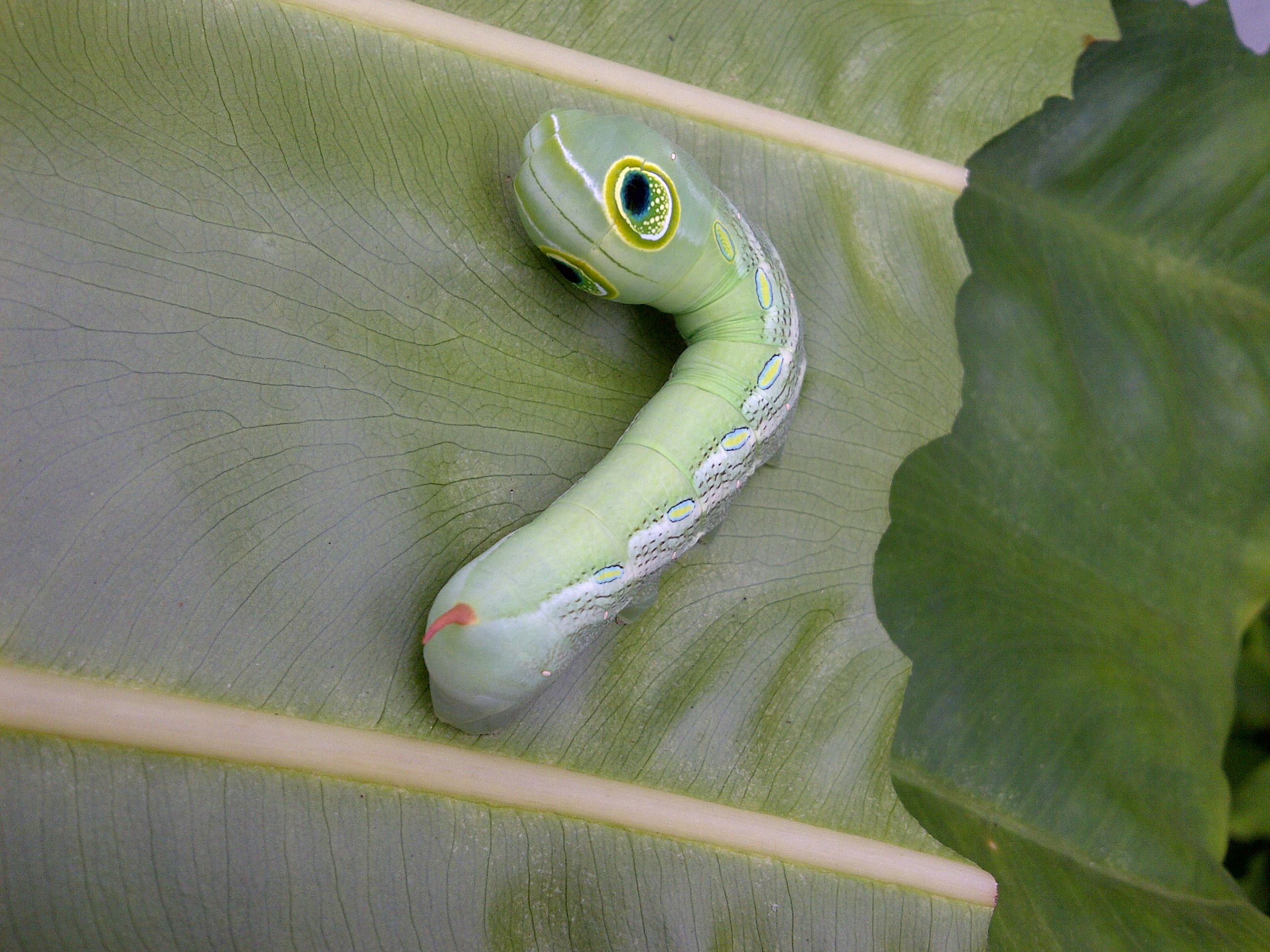
Caterpillar with extended eyespot

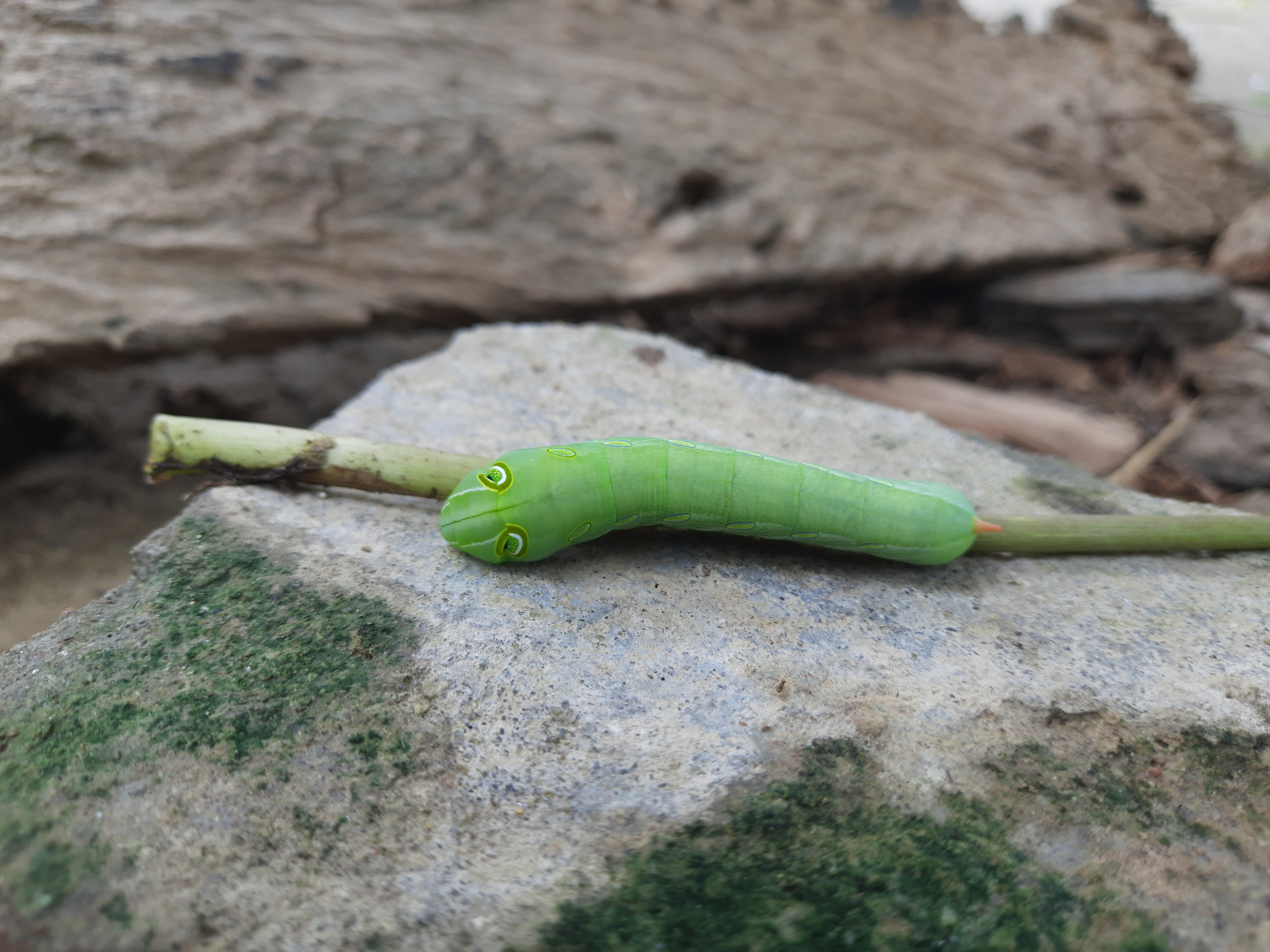
Caterpillar with eyespots in their resting state

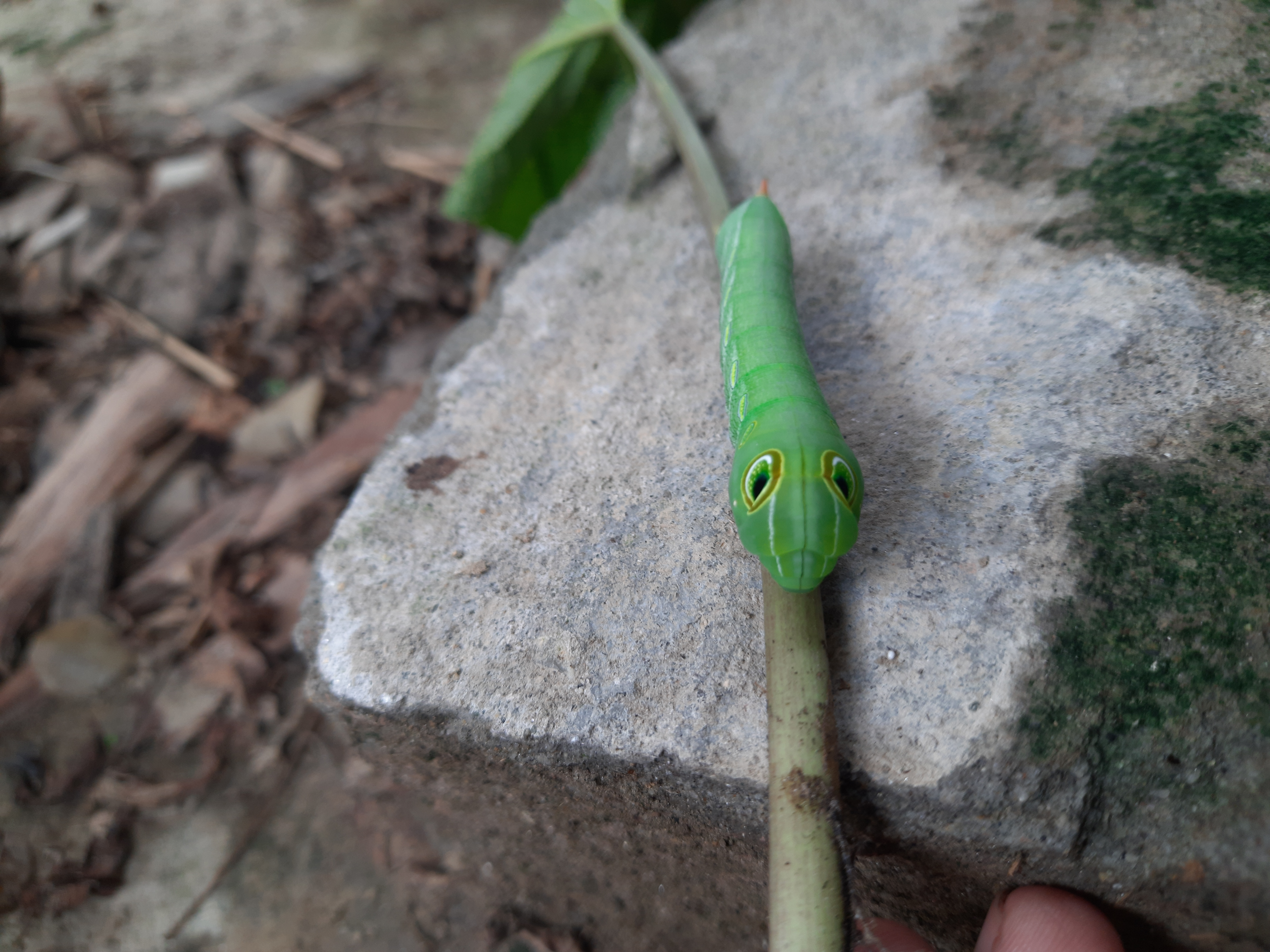
Front view with the head and the thoracic segments retracted into the body.

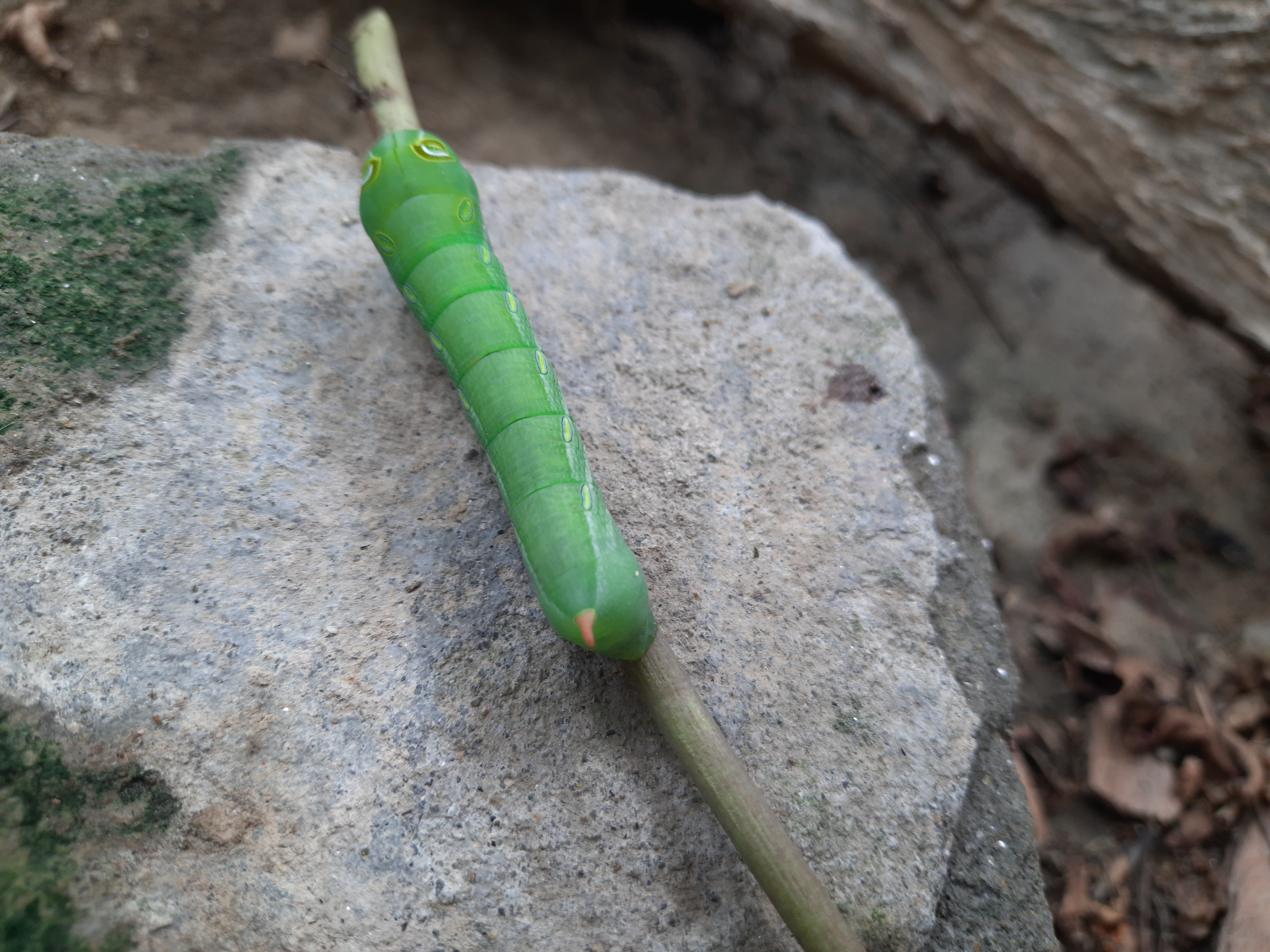
Dorsal view of Pergesa acteus caterpillar.

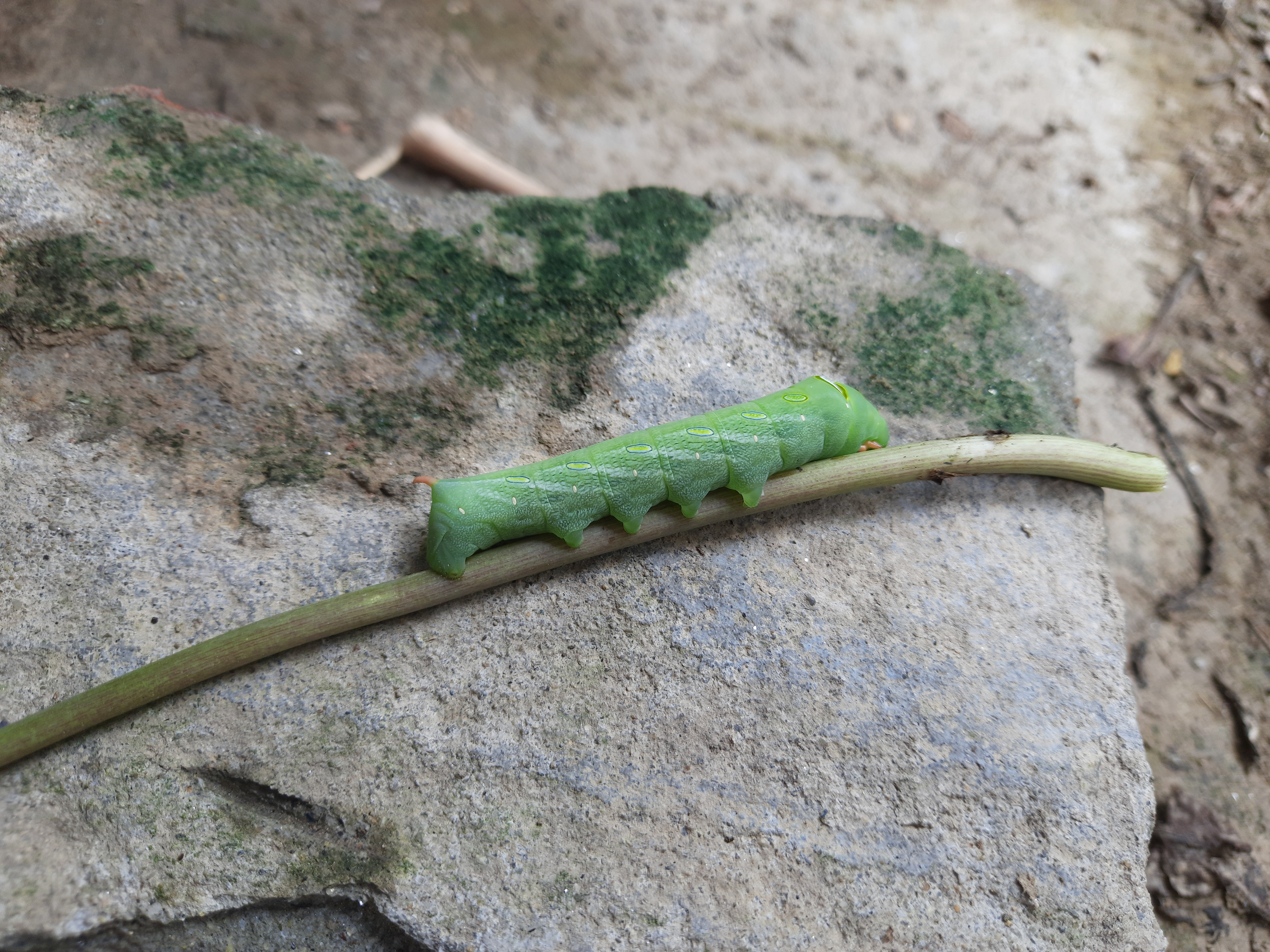
Pergesa acteus caterpillar from one side

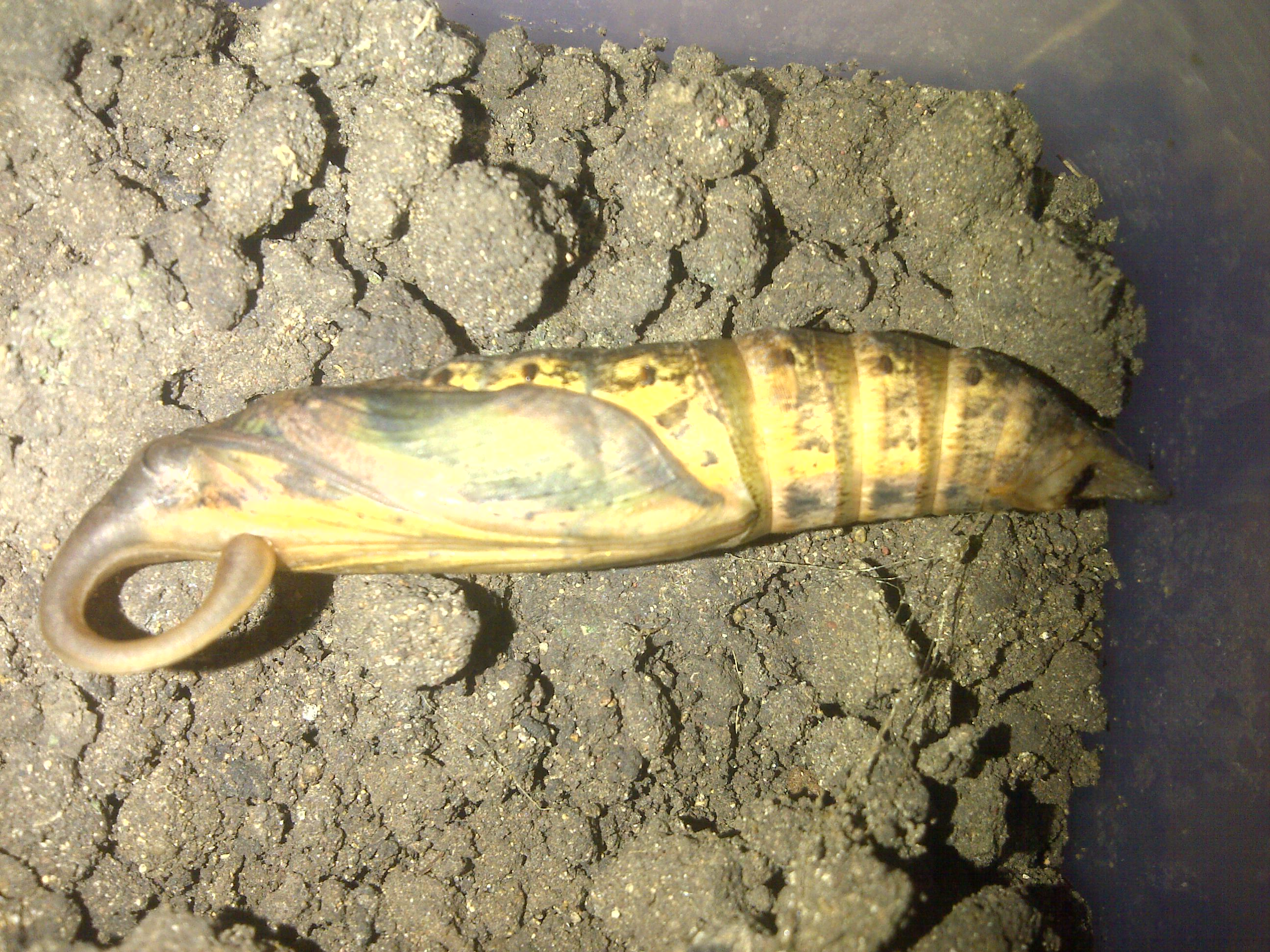
Pupa

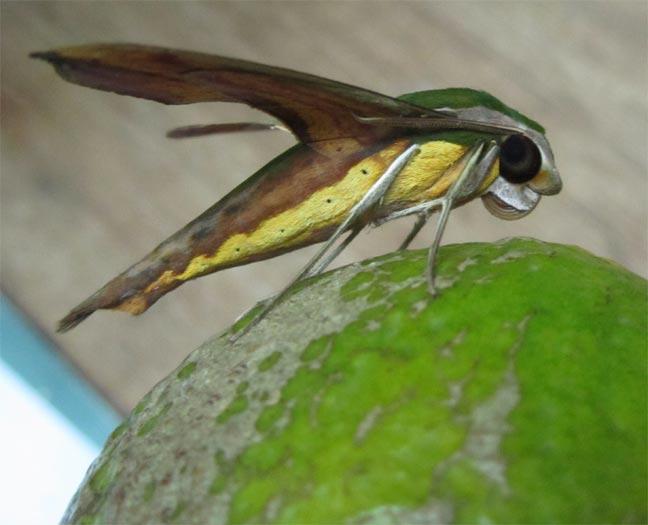
Imago side
