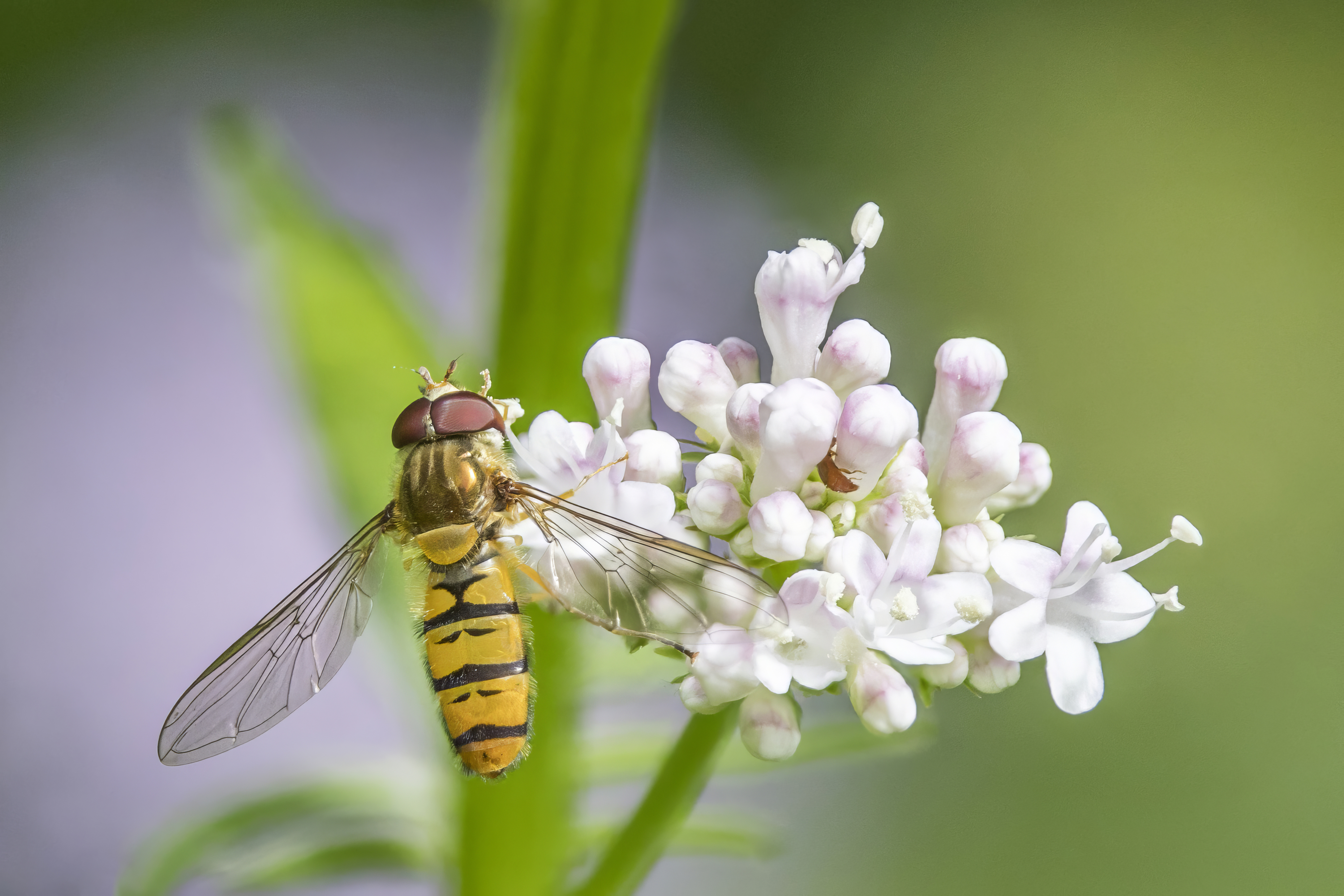

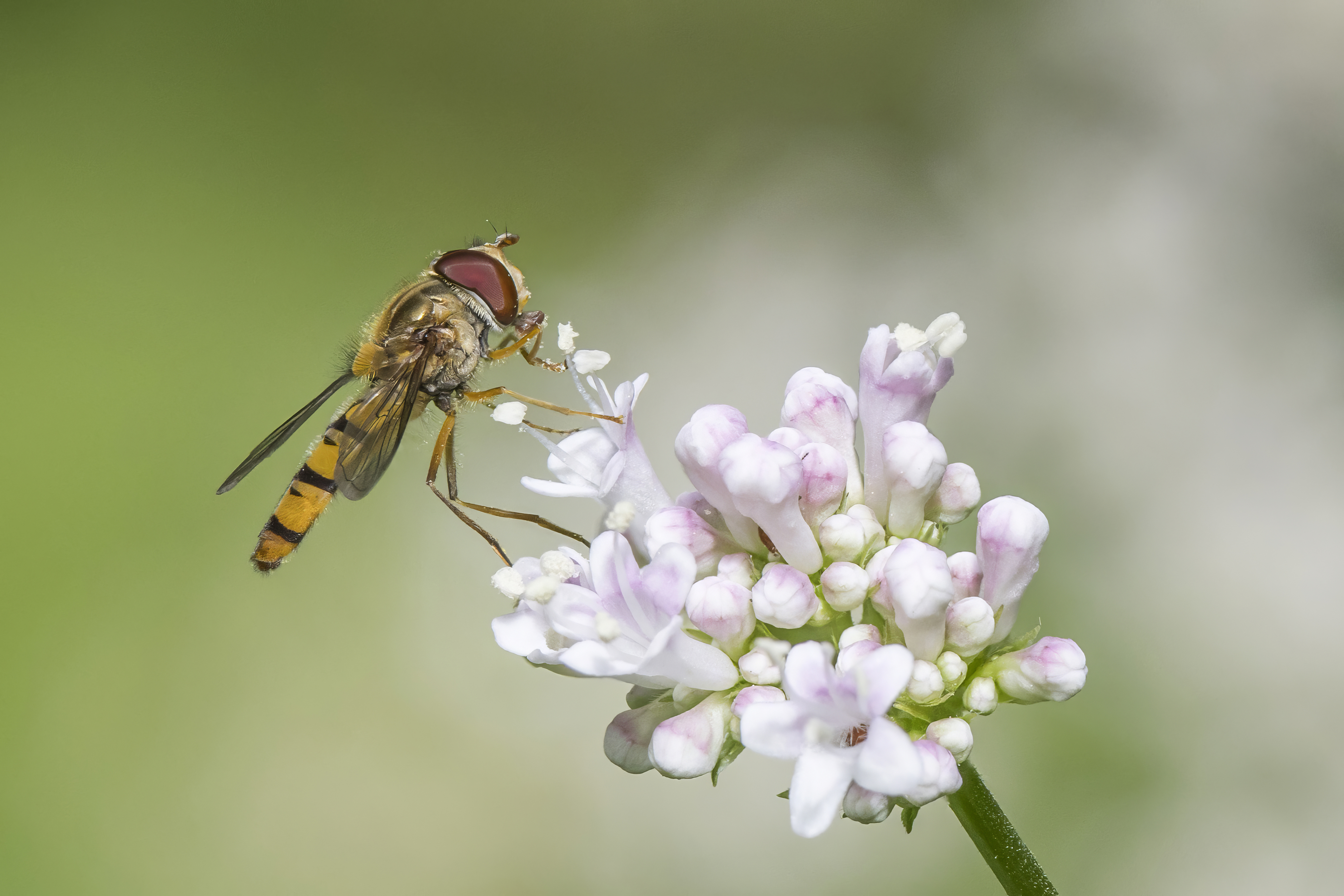
- Two views of the same male Wengen, Switzerland

Conservation status
- Least Concern (IUCN 3.1)

Scientific classification
- Kingdom: Animalia
- Phylum: Arthropoda
- Clade: Pancrustacea
- Class: Insecta
- Order: Diptera
- Family: Syrphidae
- Genus: Episyrphus
- Species: E. balteatus

Binomial name
- Episyrphus balteatus (De Geer, 1776)

Synonyms
- List: E. balteata; E. cannabinus (Scopoli, 1763); E. scitule (Harris, 1780); E. scitulus (Harris, 1780); Epistrophe balteata; Musca balteatus De Geer, 1776; Musca cannabinus Scopoli, 1763; Musca scitule Harris, 1780; Musca scitulus Harris, 1780; Syrphus balteatus

= Episyrphus balteatus =

Species of fly

Episyrphus balteatus, sometimes called the marmalade hoverfly, is a relatively small hoverfly (9–12 mm) of the Syrphidae family, widespread throughout the Palaearctic region, which covers Europe, North Asia, and North Africa. It is considered the most abundant native hoverfly in Central Europe.

== Morphology ==
The upper side of the abdomen is patterned with orange and black bands. This color pattern may appear wasp-like to other animals, such as birds, protecting it from predation – an example of Batesian mimicry. The percentage of black and yellow color can vary between individuals, and it is modulated by the length and temperature of the pupal period. Females tend to be darker than males.

Two further identifying characteristics are secondary black bands on the third and fourth dorsal plates and faint greyish longitudinal stripes on the thorax. As in most other hoverflies, males can be easily identified by their holoptic eyes, i.e., at the top of their heads their left and right compound eyes are touching.

== Habitat and life cycle ==
Episyrphus balteatus can be found throughout the year in various habitats, including urban gardens, visiting flowers for pollen and nectar. They often form dense migratory swarms, which may cause panic among people for their resemblance to wasps. In controlled experiments, adults of E. balteatus tend to prefer smaller, yellow flowers, with high concentrations of nectar. Adult E. balteatus, while not as efficient as honey bees, are significant and abundant pollinators.

The larva is terrestrial and feeds on aphids – for this reason, E. balteatus is considered one of the main natural enemies of cereal aphids. In the wild, an E. balteatus larva can consume up to about 400 aphids before pupating.

=== Migration ===
E. balteatus is a partially migratory species – it is one of the migrating hoverflies along other common species such as Eupeodes corollae. Some individuals migrate from northern Europe to southern Europe and north Africa in autumn, seeking warmer climates to spend the winter, while other adult females can overwinter. It is uncertain if this behavioural difference is controlled genetically; a study in 2013 found no genetic difference between overwintering and migrating populations, while a study in 2018 found evidence of heritability. Transcriptomic analysis discovered that at least 1543 genes are differentially expressed between overwintering and migrating individuals. These genes are involved in numerous physiological functions of the hoverfly, such as "metabolism, muscle structure and function, hormonal regulation, immunity, stress resistance, flight and feeding behaviour, longevity, reproductive diapause and sensory perception".

When migrating, E. balteatus individuals tend to fly below 300 meters (980 ft) of altitude, but many can go beyond 750 m (2,460 ft) and a few up to almost 1,000 m (3,300 ft). They are capable of selecting favourable winds, selecting airstreams above 150 m (490 ft) and using behavioural tactics to fly southward despite unfavourable winds. This means the flies must have an internal compass (probably a solar compass as in other insects) able to locate the right direction, and a way to detect wind direction.

Given the short lifespan of the insect, it has been suggested that its migration is unidirectional: a population moves south during a single season, and then slowly comes back north during summer across multiple generations. In May 2022, however, tens of thousands of dead E. balteatus were found stranded on a beach in southern France, probably caught by winds during flight, suggesting a massive spring migratory event. E. balteatus migrating north from continental Europe to southern Britain have been detected in May and June, leaving back south between August and September. The autumnal migration however involves many more individuals.

Overwintering females are often found in sheltered locations at the south-facing edges of forests. In summer they tend to move towards the north-facing edges.

== Genetics ==
The genome of Episyrphus balteatus has been sequenced in 2022 and published in 2023.

== Gallery ==
Larva

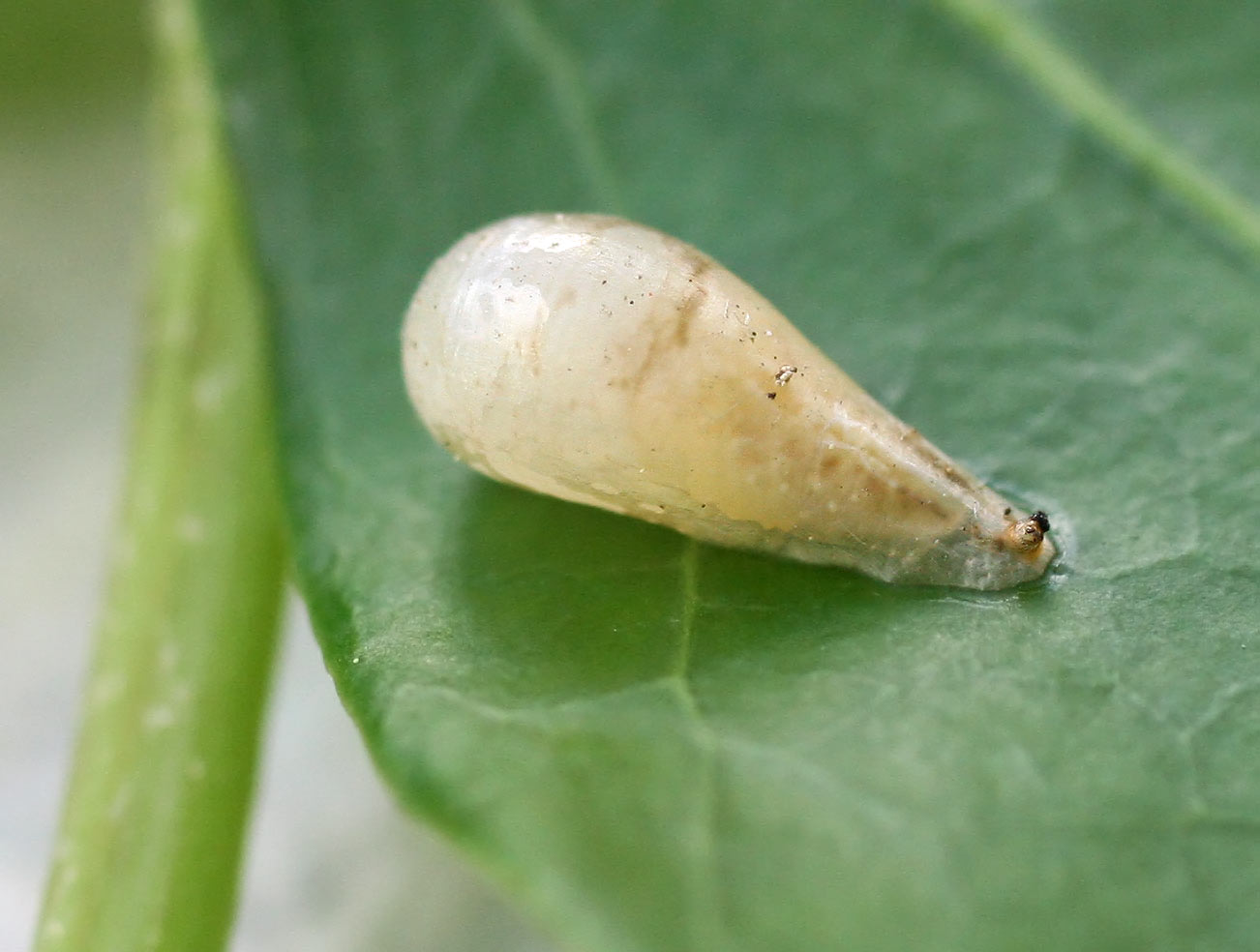
Pupa

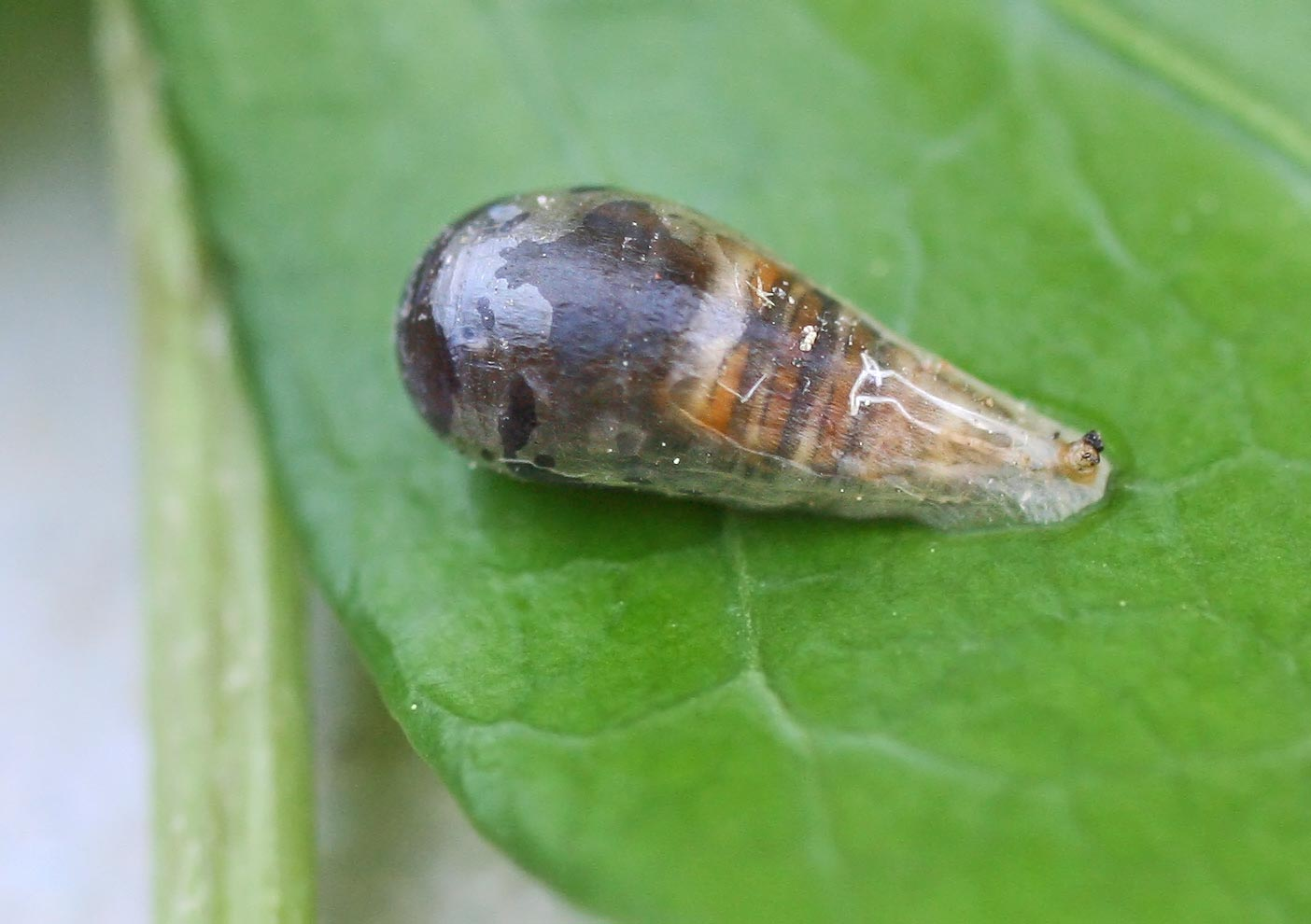
Pupa soon before emergence

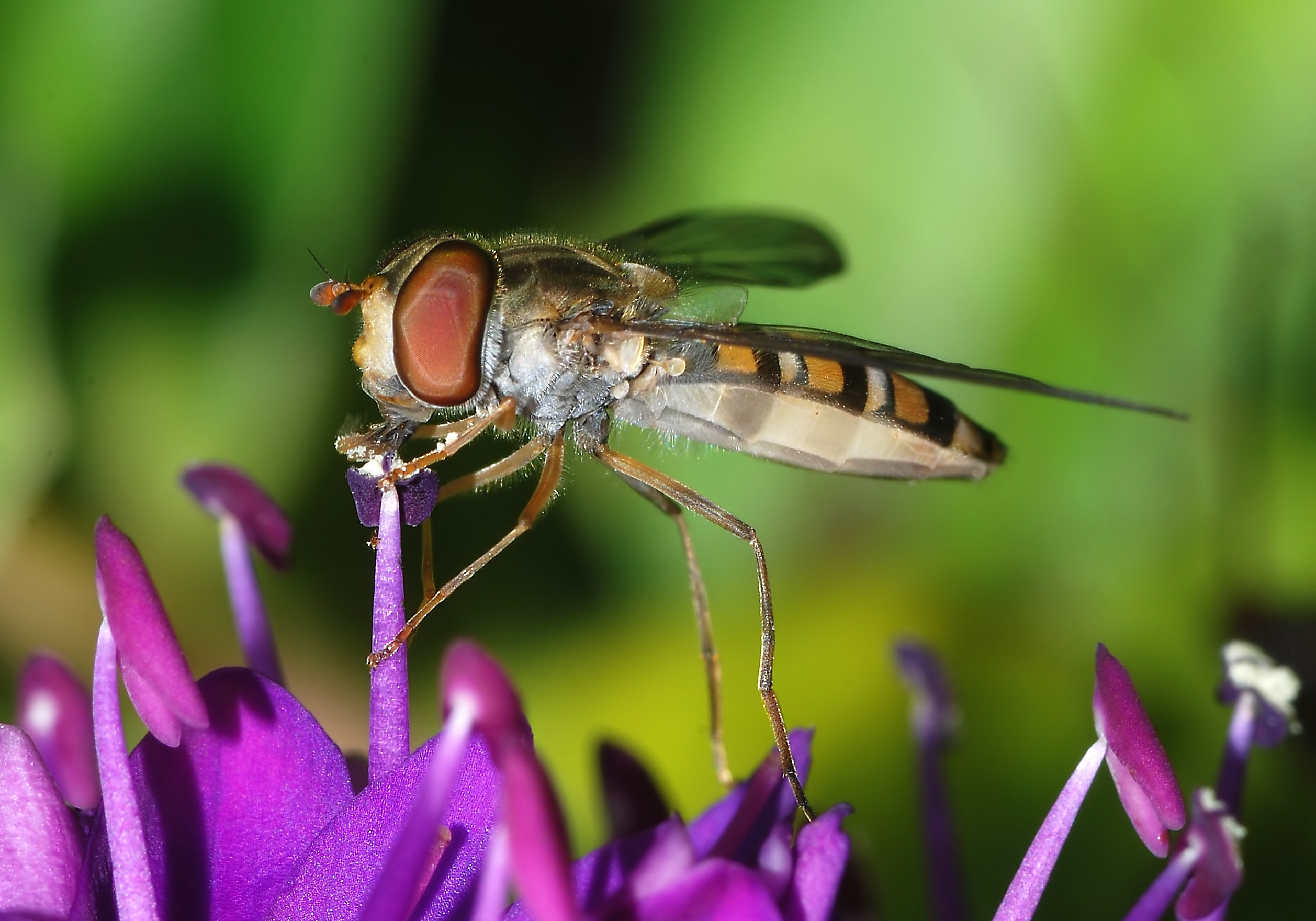
Female marmalade fly feeding on a Veronica speciosa flower

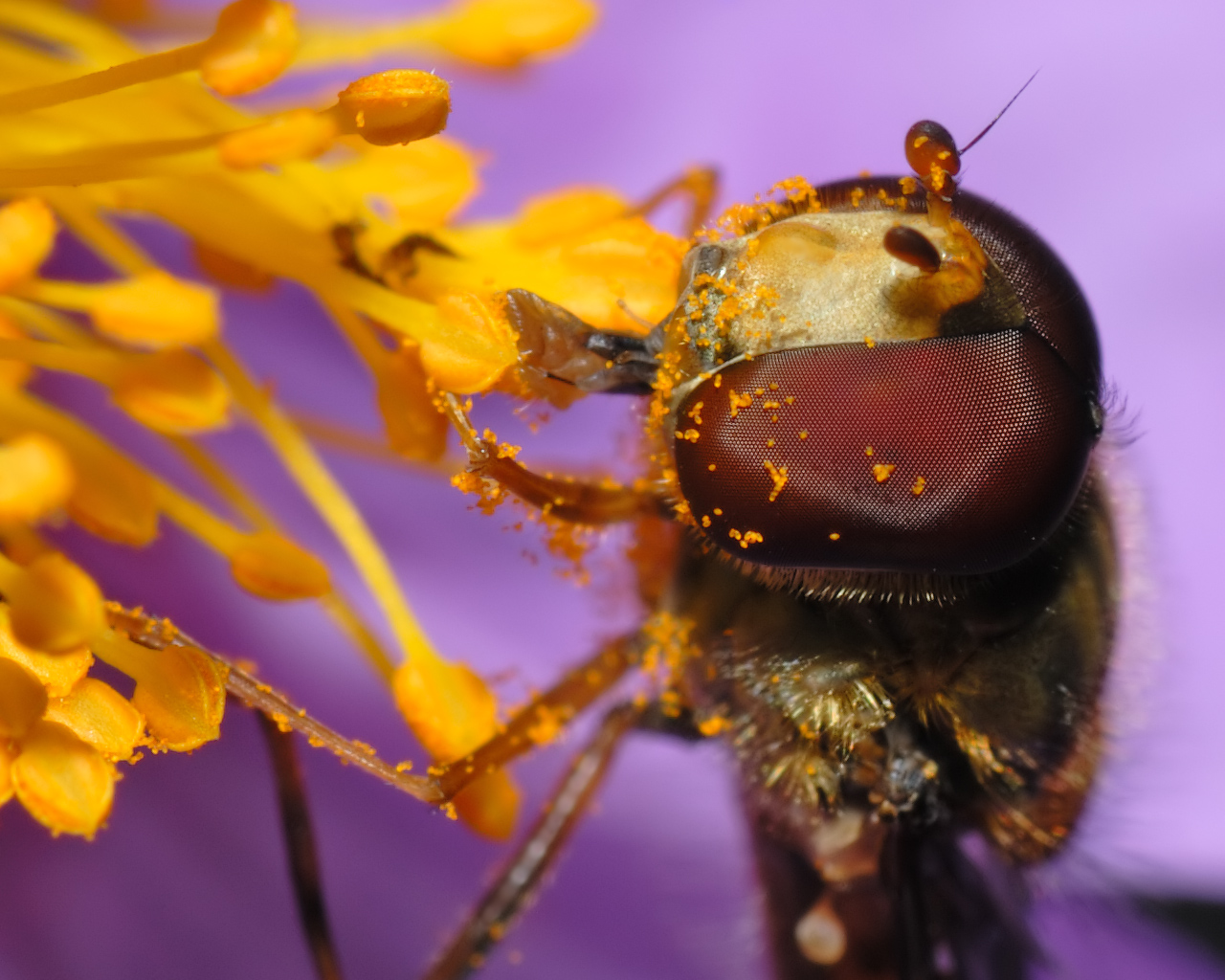
Close-up of the head of a male sitting on a flower of a grey-haired rockrose (Cistus incanus): The fly head has a diameter of 0.1 in (2.5 mm).

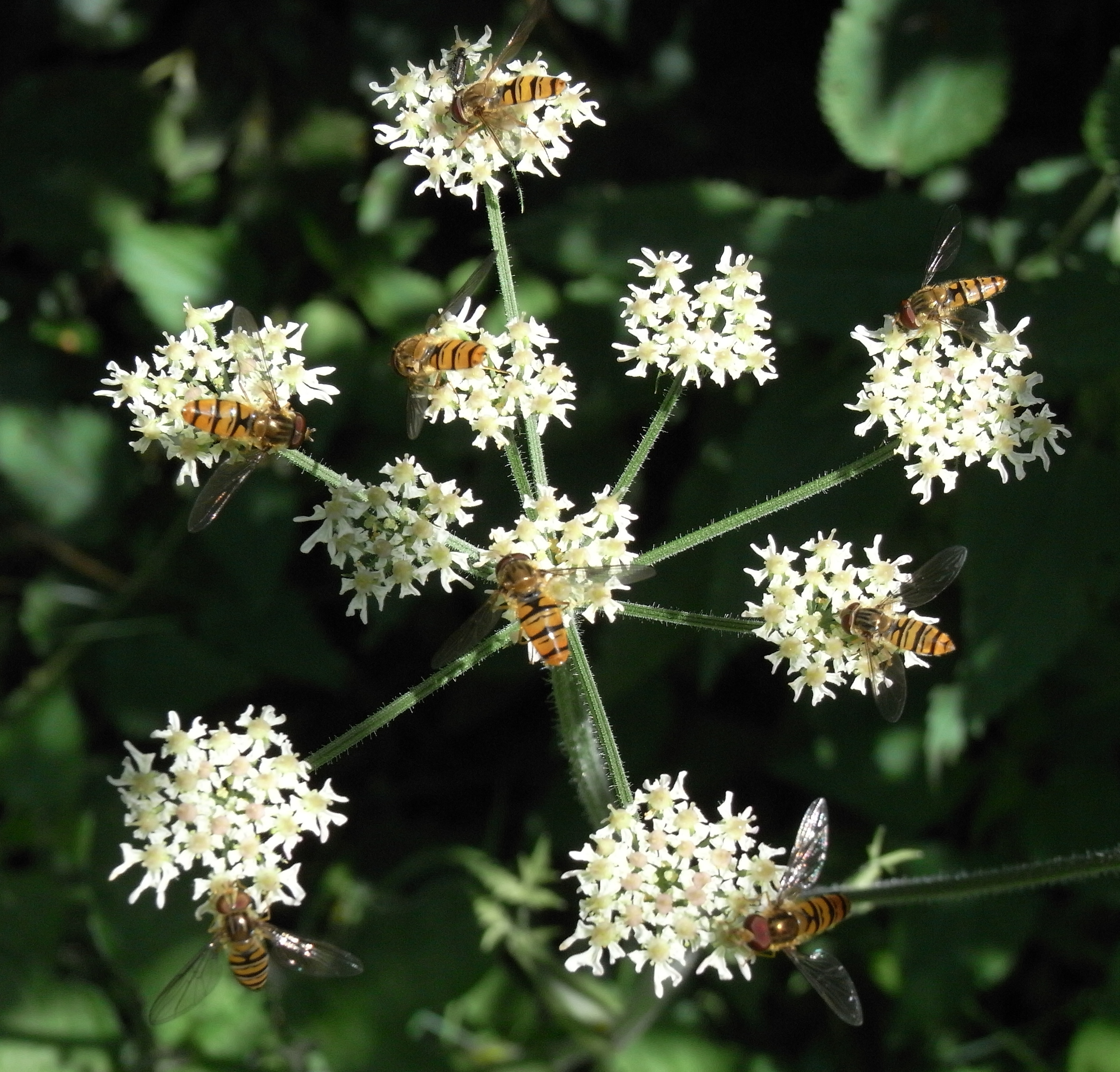
Group on hogweed

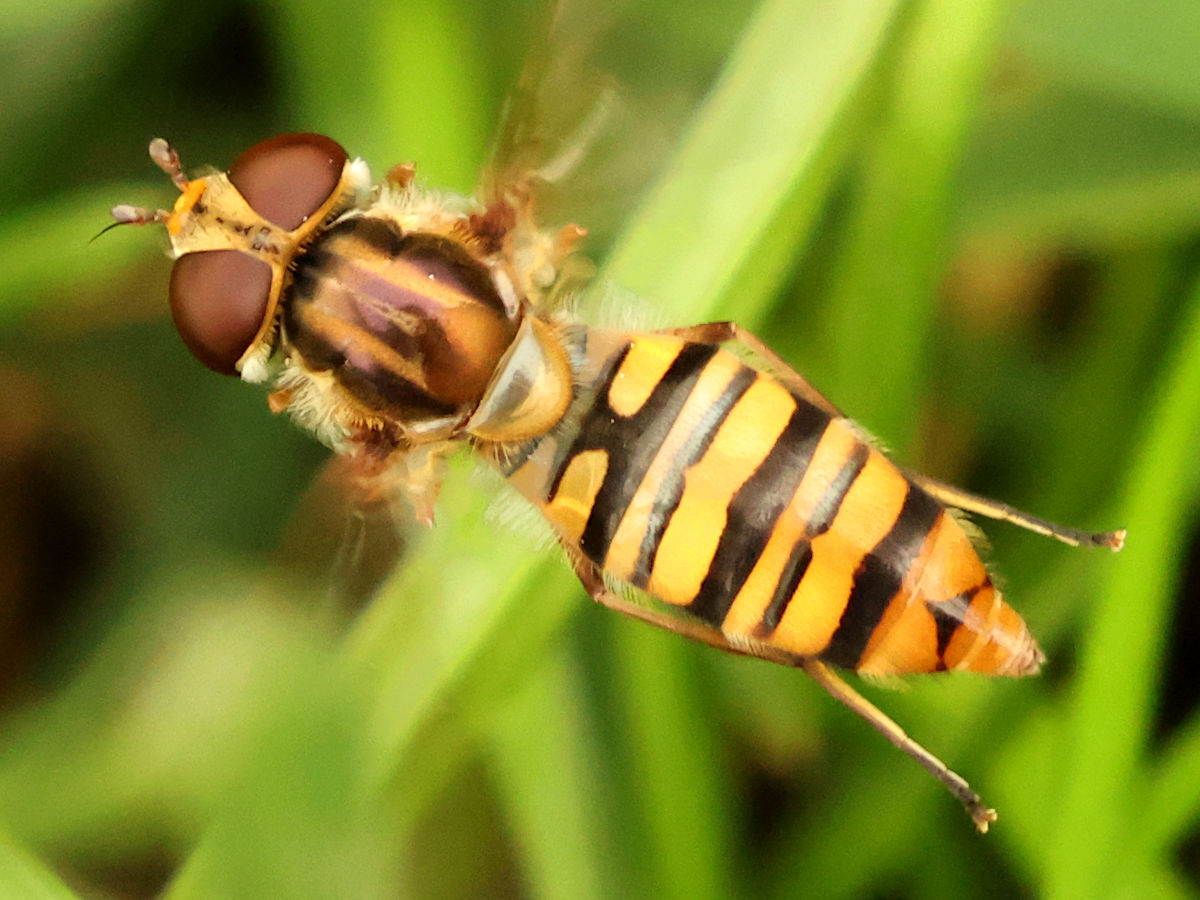
Female hovering
