= Episyrphus circularis =

Scientific classification
- Kingdom: Animalia
- Phylum: Arthropoda
- Class: Insecta
- Order: Diptera
- Family: Syrphidae
- Genus: Episyrphus
- Species: E. circularis

Binomial name
- Episyrphus circularis (Hull, 1941)

Species of hoverfly

Episyrphus circularis is a species of hoverfly present in Madagascar and Mauritius.
