= John Richard Vockeroth =

Canadian entomologist (1928-2012)

John Richard Vockeroth (2 May 1928 - 16 November 2012) was a Canadian entomologist from Broderick, Saskatchewan.

Vockeroth graduated from the University of Saskatchewan in 1948 with a B.A., followed in 1949 by a M.A. He got a D. Phil. in 1954 at Oxford University with a thesis on Scathophagidae.

Vockeroth was known for his vast knowledge of Diptera, especially on Mycetophilidae, Dolichopodidae, Syrphidae, Scathophagidae, and Muscidae. Overall he first described one family, 42 genera and 130 species of Diptera. He published 120 academic publications on 27 families of flies. In 1997, Vockeroth received the entomological C. P. Alexander award, recognizing him as a leading North American dipterist.
