= List of Commelinales of South Africa =

Flowering plants in the order Commelinales recorded from South Africa

The Commelinales are an order of flowering plants. It comprises five families: Commelinaceae, Haemodoraceae, Hanguanaceae, Philydraceae, and Pontederiaceae. All the families combined contain over 885 species in about 70 genera; the majority of species are in the Commelinaceae. Plants in the order share a number of synapomorphies that tie them together, such as a lack of mycorrhizal associations and tapetal raphides. Estimates differ as to when the Comminales evolved, but most suggest an origin and diversification sometime during the mid- to late Cretaceous. The order's closest relatives are in the Zingiberales. The anthophytes are a grouping of plant taxa bearing flower-like reproductive structures. They were formerly thought to be a clade comprising plants bearing flower-like structures. The group contained the angiosperms - the extant flowering plants, such as roses and grasses - as well as the Gnetales and the extinct Bennettitales.

23,420 species of vascular plant have been recorded in South Africa, making it the sixth most species-rich country in the world and the most species-rich country on the African continent. Of these, 153 species are considered to be threatened. Nine biomes have been described in South Africa: Fynbos, Succulent Karoo, desert, Nama Karoo, grassland, savanna, Albany thickets, the Indian Ocean coastal belt, and forests.

The 2018 South African National Biodiversity Institute's National Biodiversity Assessment plant checklist lists 35,130 taxa in the phyla Anthocerotophyta (hornworts (6)), Anthophyta (flowering plants (33534)), Bryophyta (mosses (685)), Cycadophyta (cycads (42)), Lycopodiophyta (Lycophytes(45)), Marchantiophyta (liverworts (376)), Pinophyta (conifers (33)), and Pteridophyta (cryptogams (408)).

Three families are represented in the literature. Listed taxa include species, subspecies, varieties, and forms as recorded, some of which have subsequently been allocated to other taxa as synonyms, in which cases the accepted taxon is appended to the listing. Multiple entries under alternative names reflect taxonomic revision over time.

== Commelinaceae ==
Family: Commelinaceae,

=== Aneilema ===
Genus Aneilema:

- Aneilema aequinoctiale (P.Beauv.) Loudon, indigenous
- Aneilema arenicola Faden, indigenous
- Aneilema brunneospermum Faden, indigenous
- Aneilema dregeanum Kunth, indigenous
  - Aneilema dregeanum Kunth subsp. dregeanum, indigenous
- Aneilema hockii De Wild. indigenous
  - Aneilema hockii De Wild. subsp. hockii, indigenous
  - Aneilema hockii De Wild. subsp. longiaxis Faden, indigenous
- Aneilema indehiscens Faden, indigenous
  - Aneilema indehiscens Faden subsp. lilacinum Faden, indigenous
- Aneilema longirrhizum Faden, endemic
- Aneilema nicholsonii C.B.Clarke, indigenous
- Aneilema zebrinum Chiov. indigenous

=== Callisia ===
Genus Callisia:

- Callisia fragrans (Lindl.) Woodson, not indigenous, cultivated, naturalised
- Callisia repens (Jacq.) L. not indigenous, naturalised, invasive

=== Coleotrype ===
Genus Coleotrype:

- Coleotrype natalensis C.B.Clarke, indigenous
- Commelina africana L. indigenous
  - Commelina africana L. var. africana, indigenous
  - Commelina africana L. var. barberae (C.B.Clarke) C.B.Clarke, indigenous
  - Commelina africana L. var. krebsiana (Kunth) C.B.Clarke, indigenous
  - Commelina africana L. var. lancispatha C.B.Clarke, indigenous
- Commelina bella Oberm. endemic
- Commelina benghalensis L. indigenous
- Commelina diffusa Burm.f. indigenous
  - Commelina diffusa Burm.f. subsp. diffusa, indigenous
  - Commelina diffusa Burm.f. subsp. scandens (Welw. ex C.B.Clarke) Oberm. indigenous
- Commelina eckloniana Kunth, indigenous
- Commelina erecta L. indigenous
- Commelina forskaolii Vahl, indigenous
- Commelina imberbis Ehrenb. ex Hassk. indigenous
- Commelina krebsiana Kunth, accepted as Commelina africana L. var. krebsiana (Kunth) C.B.Clarke, indigenous
- Commelina livingstonii C.B.Clarke, indigenous
- Commelina modesta Oberm. indigenous
- Commelina petersii Hassk. indigenous
- Commelina rogersii Burtt Davy, endemic
- Commelina subulata Roth, indigenous
- Commelina zambesica C.B.Clarke, indigenous

=== Cyanotis ===
Genus Cyanotis:

- Cyanotis lanata Benth. indigenous
- Cyanotis lapidosa E.Phillips, indigenous
- Cyanotis pachyrrhiza Oberm. endemic
- Cyanotis robusta Oberm. endemic
- Cyanotis speciosa (L.f.) Hassk. indigenous

=== Floscopa ===
Genus Floscopa:

- Floscopa glomerata (Willd. ex Schult. & J.H.Schult.) Hassk. indigenous

=== Murdannia ===
Genus Murdannia:

- Murdannia simplex (Vahl) Brenan, indigenous

=== Tradescantia ===
Genus Tradescantia:

- Tradescantia fluminensis Vell. not indigenous, cultivated, naturalised, invasive
- Tradescantia pallida (Rose) D.R.Hunt, not indigenous, cultivated, naturalised
- Tradescantia zebrina Bosse, not indigenous, naturalised, invasive

=== Zebrina ===
Genus Zebrina:

- Zebrina pendula Schnizl. accepted as Tradescantia zebrina Bosse, not indigenous, naturalised, invasive

== Haemodoraceae ==
Family: Haemodoraceae,

=== Anigozanthos ===
Genus Anigozanthos:

- Anigozanthos flavidus DC. not indigenous, cultivated, naturalised, invasive

=== Barberetta ===
Genus Barberetta:

- Barberetta aurea Harv. endemic

=== Dilatris ===
Genus Dilatris:

- Dilatris corymbosa P.J.Bergius, endemic
- Dilatris ixioides Lam. endemic
- Dilatris paniculata L.f. accepted as Dilatris viscosa L.f. present
- Dilatris pillansii W.F.Barker, endemic
- Dilatris viscosa L.f. endemic

=== Wachendorfia ===
Genus Wachendorfia:

- Wachendorfia brachyandra W.F.Barker, endemic
- Wachendorfia graminifolia L.f. accepted as Wachendorfia paniculata Burm. present
- Wachendorfia multiflora (Klatt) J.C.Manning & Goldblatt, endemic
- Wachendorfia paniculata Burm. endemic
- Wachendorfia parviflora W.F.Barker, accepted as Wachendorfia multiflora (Klatt) J.C.Manning & Goldblatt, present
- Wachendorfia thyrsiflora Burm. endemic

== Pontederiaceae ==
Family: Pontederiaceae,

=== Eichhornia ===
Genus Eichhornia:

- Eichhornia crassipes (Mart.) Solms, not indigenous, naturalised, invasive

=== Heteranthera ===
Genus Heteranthera:

- Heteranthera callifolia Rchb. ex Kunth, indigenous

=== Monochoria ===
Genus Monochoria:

- Monochoria africana (Solms) N.E.Br. indigenous

=== Pontederia ===
Genus Pontederia:

- Pontederia cordata L. not indigenous, naturalised, invasive
  - Pontederia cordata L. var. ovalis Solms, not indigenous, naturalised
