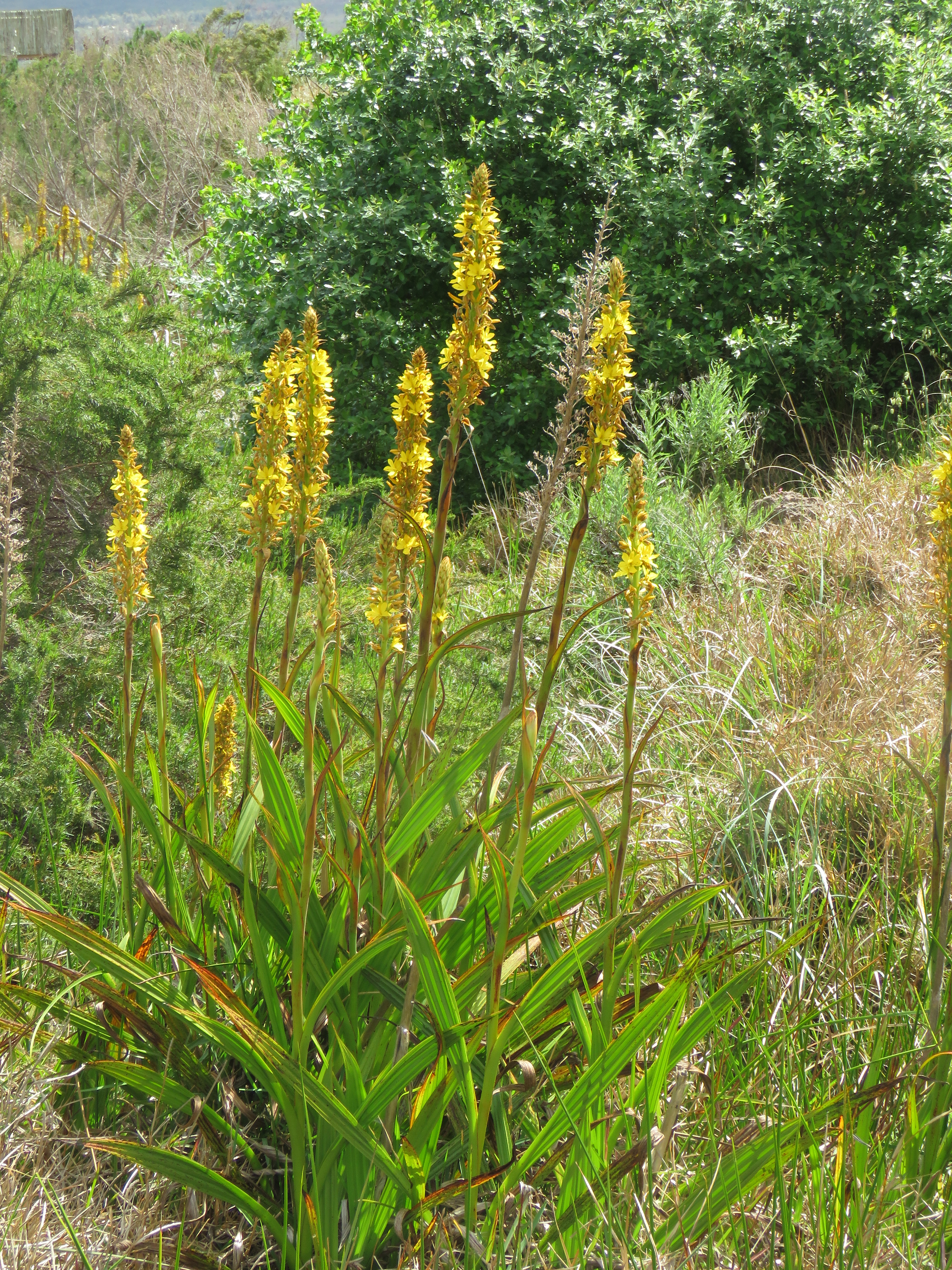

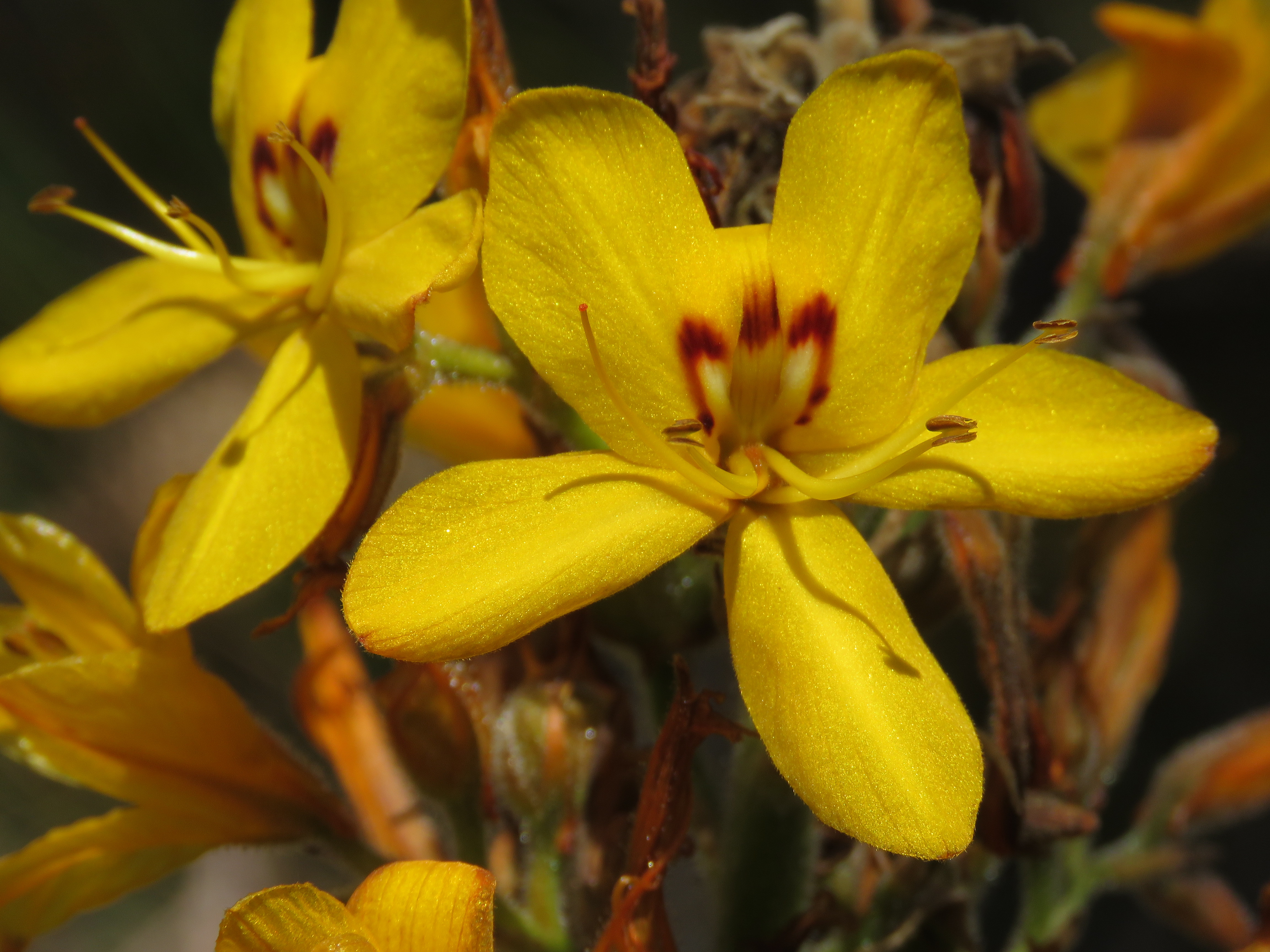

Scientific classification
- Kingdom: Plantae
- Clade: Tracheophytes
- Clade: Angiosperms
- Clade: Monocots
- Clade: Commelinids
- Order: Commelinales
- Family: Haemodoraceae
- Genus: Wachendorfia
- Species: W. thyrsiflora

Binomial name
- Wachendorfia thyrsiflora Burm., 1757

= Wachendorfia thyrsiflora =

Species of flowering plant

Wachendorfia thyrsiflora, the marsh butterfly lily, is a plant species of 0.6–2.5 m (2.0–8.2 ft) high when flowering, that has been assigned to the bloodroot family. It is a large to very large evergreen perennial plant with an underground rootstock with clusters of roots produced at the nodes. The rootstock has a distinctive red colour that results from so-called arylphenalenone pigments. The sturdy, entire and broadly sword-shaped leaves have laterally flattened and pleated leaf blades. The golden yellow flowers are set a dense cylindrical panicle on a tall firm stalk. Flowering occurs from spring until mid-summer.

== Description ==
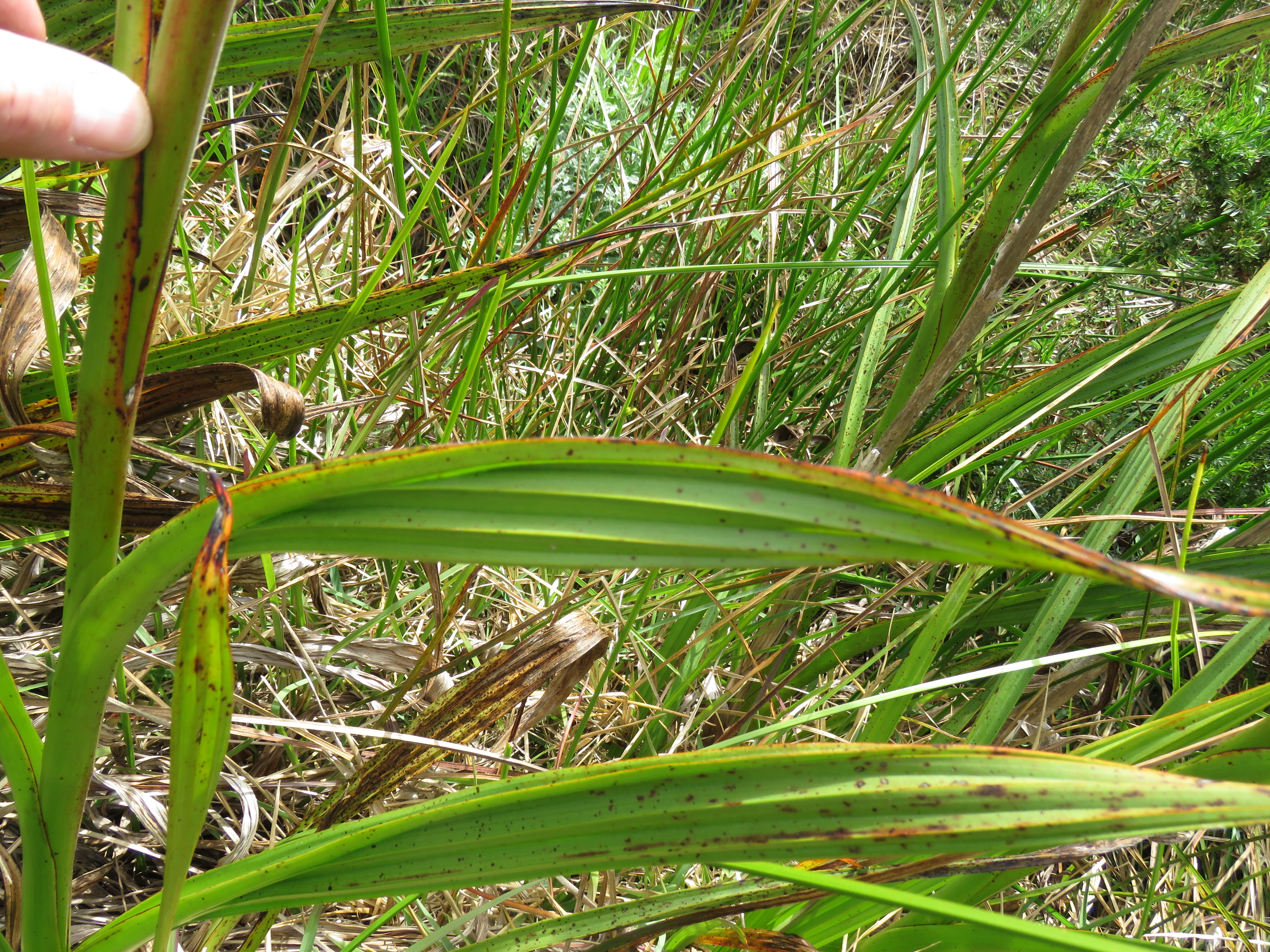
Pleated leaves on the stem of W. thyrsiflora

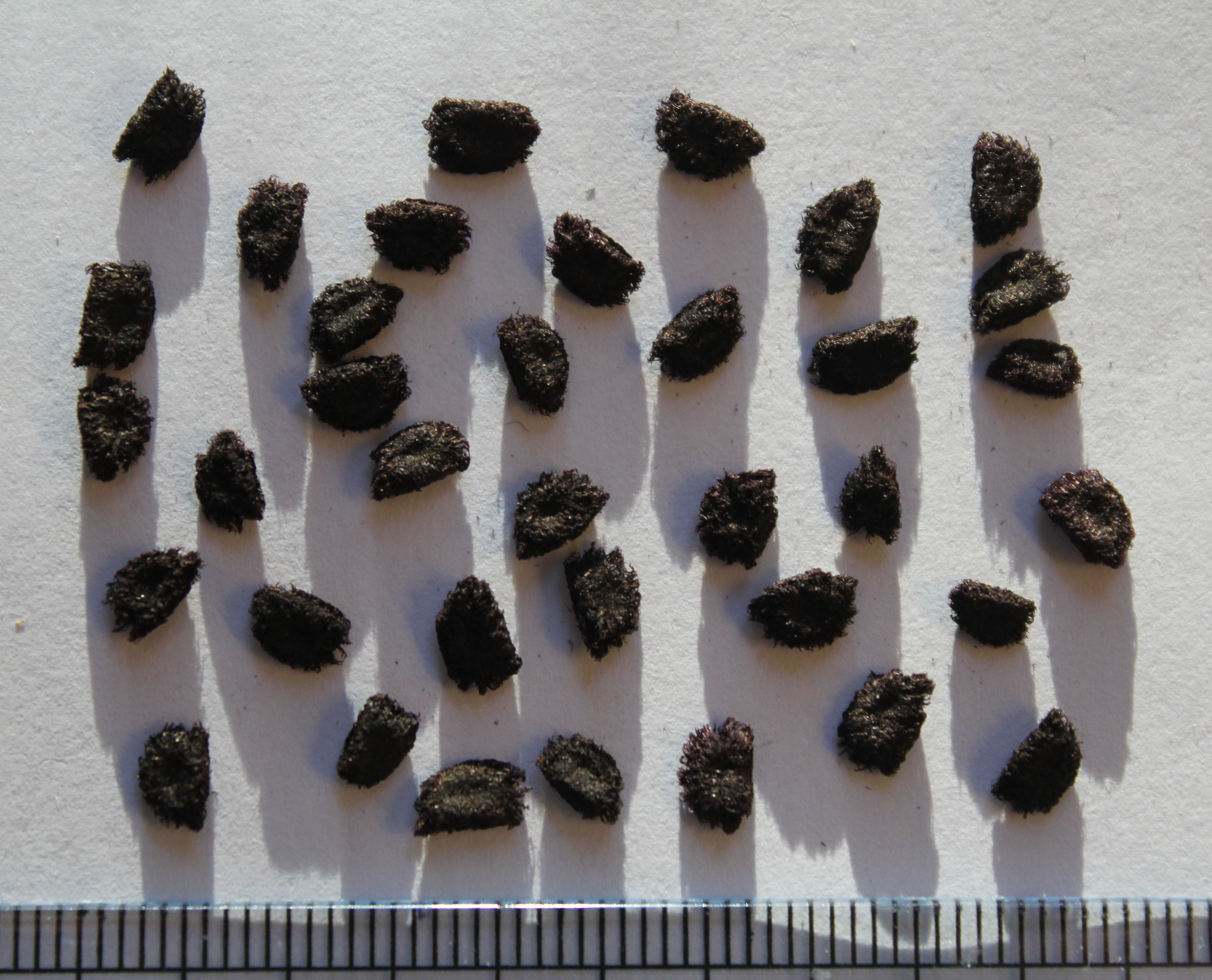
W. thyrsiflora seeds

The marsh butterfly lily is a perennial herbaceous plant of 0.6–2.5 m (2.0–8.2 ft) high, that grows from an irregular, more or less cylindrical rootstock of up to 15 cm (5.9 in) long, sheathed by the overlapping bases of the leaves and that produce roots from the nodes. The leaves are up to 90 cm (35 in) long and 8 cm (3.1 in) wide, evergreen, upright, strap- to lance-shaped, deeply pleated, firm, hairless and mostly shorter than the flowering stem. Younger plants may have leaves less than 5 cm (2.0 in) wide. The flowering stem may be up to 2.5 m (8.2 ft) long and up to 1.5 cm (0.59 in) at the base, robust, upright, with many soft hairs of up to 4 mm (0.16 in) long towards the base gradually transforming into glandular hairs of about 1 mm (0.039 in) long towards the top of the flowering branches. The inflorescence is a dense cylindrical panicle of up to 60 cm (24 in) long and 20 cm (7.9 in) wide. The inflorescence has many, up to 10 cm (3.9 in) long branches that are regularly spaced on the top half of the stem. In younger plants the inflorescence is often more open. Each branch seldom carries more than 7 flower buds and the branches themselves do not divide further. The persistent lance-shaped bracts are 1–4 cm (0.39–1.57 in) long, dry, brown and papery, and recurved at their tips. The zygomorphic perianth consists of six somewhat spade-shaped, golden yellow tepals of 12–28 mm (0.47–1.10 in) long and 8–14 mm (0.31–0.55 in) wide. The upper 3 tepals may be adorned near their base with light to dark markings that function as nectar guides. The central upper tepal is shorter and narrower than the others and has a slightly recurved tip. The upper five tepals are overlapping. The tepals may sometimes have a row of orange hairs of equal length and at regular intervals along the rim. The filaments are about one quarter of the length of the tepals at 15–20 mm (0.59–0.79 in) long and widely spreading. They are topped by anthers of 1.2–2.0 mm (0.047–0.079 in) long and 0.5–1.0 mm (0.020–0.039 in) wide. In the centre of each flower is a yellowish, superiorly positioned ovary of 2–3 mm (0.079–0.118 in) high and 1–2 mm (0.039–0.079 in) in diameter. On top of the ovary is a style of 13–18 mm (0.51–0.71 in) long, conspicuously angled to either the right or the left, opposite two of the stamens. The ovary develops into a capsule with three compartments of approximately 1 cm (0.39 in)high and 0.7–1 cm (0.28–0.39 in) in diameter. The seeds are densely hairy, up to 5 mm (0.20 in) long and kidney-shaped to oval. The base chromosome count is 15 (n=15).

=== Differences from related species ===
W. thyrsiflora differs from W. paniculata, which is a small to large, 0.1–0.9 m (0.33–2.95 ft), deciduous herb with apricot, yellow or orange flowers in a lax to dense panicle, with leaves narrower than 2 cm (0.79 in), and that may grow in dry and wetter circumstances (not a large to very large, 0.6–2.5 m (2.0–8.2 ft) high, evergreen herb with golden yellow flowers in a dense spiky inflorescence, with leaves mostly much wider than 1.5 cm (0.59 in), and that is restricted to damp environments). W. brachyandra has apricot to pale yellow flowers in a lax panicle, clustered stamens, which are like the style less than half the length of the tepals (not golden yellow flowers in a dense cylindrical inflorescence, diverging stamens and style of at least two thirds as long as the tepals). W. multiflora is a small plant of up to 25 cm (9.8 in) high, with leaves that are usually longer than the very short and dense inflorescence, with green, erect bracts, dull yellow, later purplish brown flowers with narrow tepals, 15–25 mm (0.59–0.98 in) long and 3–6 mm (0.12–0.24 in) wide (not a large to very large plant of 60-250 cm high, the inflorescence much longer than the leaves, with brown and papery bracts that often have recurved tips, and golden yellow flowers with wide tepals of 13–31 mm (0.51–1.22 in) long and 4–16 mm (0.16–0.63 in) wide).

== Taxonomy ==
The first description of the marsh butterfly lily was published in 1700 by the English botanist Leonard Plukenet in his book Almagesti botanici mantissa. He named it Erythrobulbus. The description was based on a collection made by Henrik Bernard Oldenland between 1689 and 1697. In 1739, Johann Philipp Breyne described and illustrated Asphodelus latifolius in his book Prodromus fasciculi rariorum plantarum, but these names predate the start of Linnaean taxonomy in 1753 and are therefore invalid. Johannes Burman described W. thyrsiflora in his monography of the genus Wachendorfia. Richard Anthony Salisbury created the name W. elata in his book Flora Capensis - sistens plantas promontorii Bonæ Spei Africes - secundum systema sexuale emendatum of 1811. In their 1992 revision of the genus Wachendorfia, Nick Helme and Hans Peter Linder conclude that W. elata is a synonym of W. thyrsiflora.

=== Names ===
The genus Wachendorfia is named in honor of Evert Jacob van Wachendorff, professor of botany and chemistry and later rector at the University of Utrecht in the 18th century. The species name thyrsiflora is a compound of the Ancient Greek θύρσος (thúrsos), meaning "staff" and the Latin flora, the goddess of flowers, indicating that the flowers are arranged as if on a staff.

=== Phylogeny ===
Comparison of homologous DNA has increased the insight in the phylogenetic relationships between the species of Wachendorfia. The following tree represents those insights.

- genus Wachendorfia
  - Wachendorfia thyrsiflora
  - - - W. brachyandra
      - W. multiflora
    - W. paniculata

== Distribution, ecology and conservation ==
The marsh butterfly lily can be found from the Olifants River Valley somewhere between Clanwilliam and Citrusdal in the Western Cape, southwards to the Cape Peninsula, as far as the Franschhoek Mountains inland, and eastwards along the south coast to Humansdorp in the Eastern Cape province of South Africa. Like in all species of Wachendorfia, the flowers of the marsh butterfly lily are enantiomorphic. This means that the style is sometimes sharply deflected to the right, while in other plants it is bent to the left. In both morphs one of the three stamens is deflected to the same side as the style, whereas the remaining two curve in the opposite direction. This is thought to be a mechanism that enhances crosspollination and so boost genetic diversity. The anthers and stigma however are so far from the source of the nectar at the merged bases of the three upper tepals, that smaller insects, including honey bees cannot be effective pollinators. Pollinators of an adequate size, such as carpenter bees are seldom seen visiting butterfly lilies. The pollination biology of these plants therefore remains unknown. The seeds are hard and float on water, and this is probably an adaptation to distribution by water. W. thyrsiflora grows from sea-level to approximately 1,200 m (3,900 ft) altitude, in permanently moist environments such as the banks of streams and seeps. It flowers in spring but blooms can often be found during summer, probably reflecting that this species does not suffer from water-stress because it grows in permanently moist environments. The marsh butterfly lily is considered a least-concern species.

== Cultivation ==
The marsh butterfly lily is easy to grow and particularly suited for moist conditions in the full sun or light shade. The plant behaves as an evergreen if water remains available year round, but will become dormant in summer if it dries out. It grows rapidly and will continue flowering well without replanting for several years. The species does not survive severe frosts, but will certainly allow −1 °C (30 °F), possibly even −7 °C (19 °F) when in a sheltered position. No pests or diseases of this species are known. Wachendorfia thyrsiflora can be propagated both from seed and through dividing the rootstock. Seeds can best be sown during the autumn, in deep seedling mix, keeping them permanently moist. Seedlings should be ready to transplant in three years. Flowers may be expected from their fourth year. Large plants can best be divided after flowering in the early summer and replanted immediately.
