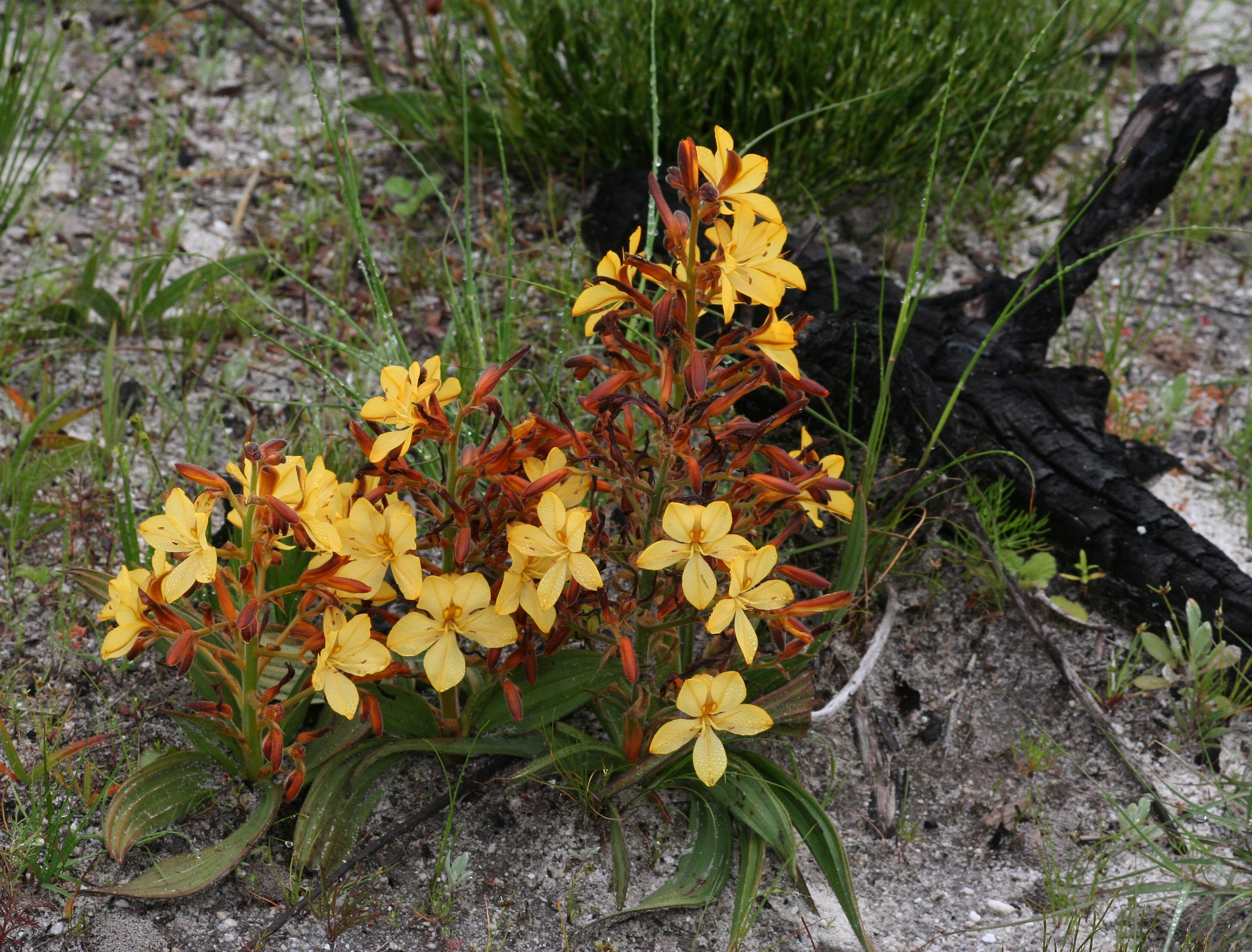

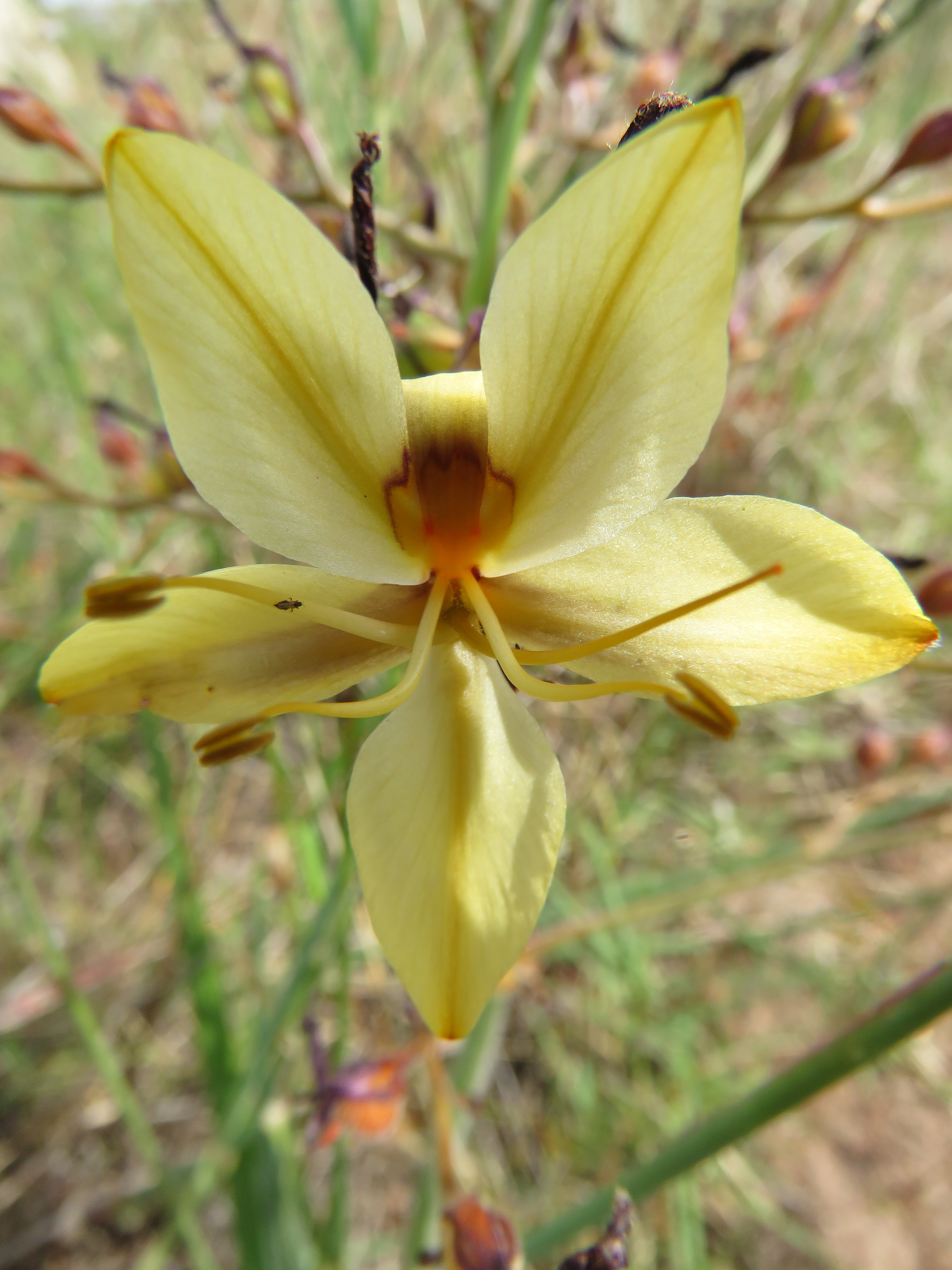

Scientific classification
- Kingdom: Plantae
- Clade: Tracheophytes
- Clade: Angiosperms
- Clade: Monocots
- Clade: Commelinids
- Order: Commelinales
- Family: Haemodoraceae
- Genus: Wachendorfia
- Species: W. paniculata

Binomial name
- Wachendorfia paniculata Burm., 1757

= Wachendorfia paniculata =

Common Butterfly Lily

Species of flowering plant

Wachendorfia paniculata, the common butterfly lily, is a species of plant of 10–90 cm (3.9–35.4 in) high, that emerges during the winter from an underground rootstock. It has entire, sword-shaped, mostly hairy, line- to lance-shaped, straight or sickle-shaped leaves, set in a fan at ground level with a lax to dense panicle consisting of pale apricot to yellow mirror-symmetric flowers with six tepals, three stamens and an undivided style that curves either to the right or left. The species is assigned to the bloodroot family. Flowering occurs between August and December at sea level, and until early February at high altitude, with a distinct peak from September to November. It can only be found in the Cape provinces of South Africa. Like other species of Wachendorfia, it is called butterfly lily in English and rooikanol or spinnekopblom in Afrikaans, and this species in particular is also called koffiepit in Afrikaans.

== Description ==
Koffiepit is a perennial herbaceous plant of 10–90 cm (3.9–35.4 in) high, that emerges from a roughly egg-shaped, red rootstock of up to 5 cm (2.0 in) in diameter. Its dull to yellowish green, line- to narrowly lance-shaped or broadly sickle-shaped leaves of 1–7 mm (0.039–0.276 in) wide and 5–35 cm (2.0–13.8 in) long, each have three veins, may be hairy or hairless, appear annually during the winter half year and die when the plant releases its seed to survive the dry, hot summer. The flowering stem is densely covered in short, simple hairs, may sometimes reach a height of 1 m (3.3 ft) and is 3–15 mm (0.12–0.59 in) in diameter. The inflorescence is a lax or dense panicle with 5-20 scorpiioid cymes, each of which contains up to seven flowers. The bracts at each branching are 5–50 mm (0.20–1.97 in) long, dry, brown and papery in consistency during flowering, more or less enclose the base of the branch and have a tip that tapers to a long point with concave edges, which is often recurved.

The mirror-symmetrical, slightly scented perianth has six apricot, orange or pale to bright yellow tepals of 13–31 mm (0.51–1.22 in) wide and 4–16 mm (0.16–0.63 in) wide (on average 21×10 mm) that sometimes have a row of regularly spaced hairs of equal length along their margin. The lower three tepals are free and the lower central tepal is often wider than the others. The upper central tepal is often shorter, narrower, curved at the top and with brownish hair on the back comparable to the hair on the pedicel. The upper three tepals often have dark markings, and have merged with each other at their base, which is the location of the two nectaries. The three stamens are two thirds to three quarters of the length of the tepals and spread widely. The anthers at the tip of the stamens are 2–3 mm (0.079–0.118 in) long and 0.8–1.0 mm (0.031–0.039 in) wide. The style is conspicuously diverted to either the right or left, opposite two of the stamens and 15–21 mm (0.59–0.83 in) long, which is as long as the shortest of the three stamens. The fruit is a sharply three-lobed capsule of about 1 cm (0.39 in) high and 0.5 cm (0.20 in) in diameter. Each of the three cavities contains one spherical, brown seed of about 2 mm (0.079 in) in diameter that is covered in coarse hairs.

The base chromosome number is 15 (n=15).

=== Differences with related species ===
W. paniculata differs from W. thyrsiflora, which is a large to very large, 0.6–2 m (2.0–6.6 ft) high, evergreen herb with golden yellow flowers in a dense spiky inflorescence, with leaves mostly much wider than 1.5 cm (0.59 in), and that is restricted to damp environments (not a small to large, 0.1–0.9 m (0.33–2.95 ft), deciduous herb with apricot, yellow or orange flowers in a lax to dense panicle, with leaves narrower than 2 cm (0.79 in), and that may grow in dry and wetter circumstances). W. brachyandra has apricot to pale yellow flowers in a lax panicle, clustered stamens, which are like the style less than half the length of the tepals (not apricot to pale or bright yellow or orange flowers in a lax to dense panicle, diverging stamens and style of at least two thirds as long as the tepals). W. multiflora is a small plant of up to 25 cm (9.8 in) high, with leaves that are usually longer than the very short and dense inflorescence, with green, erect bracts, dull yellow, later purplish brown flowers with narrow tepals, 15–25 mm (0.59–0.98 in) long and 3–6 mm (0.12–0.24 in) wide (not a small to large plant of 10–90 cm high, the inflorescence usually longer than the leaves, with brown and papery bracts that often have recurved tips, and apricot to yellow or orange flowers with wide tepals of 13–31 mm (0.51–1.22 in) long and 4–16 mm (0.16–0.63 in) wide).

== Taxonomy ==
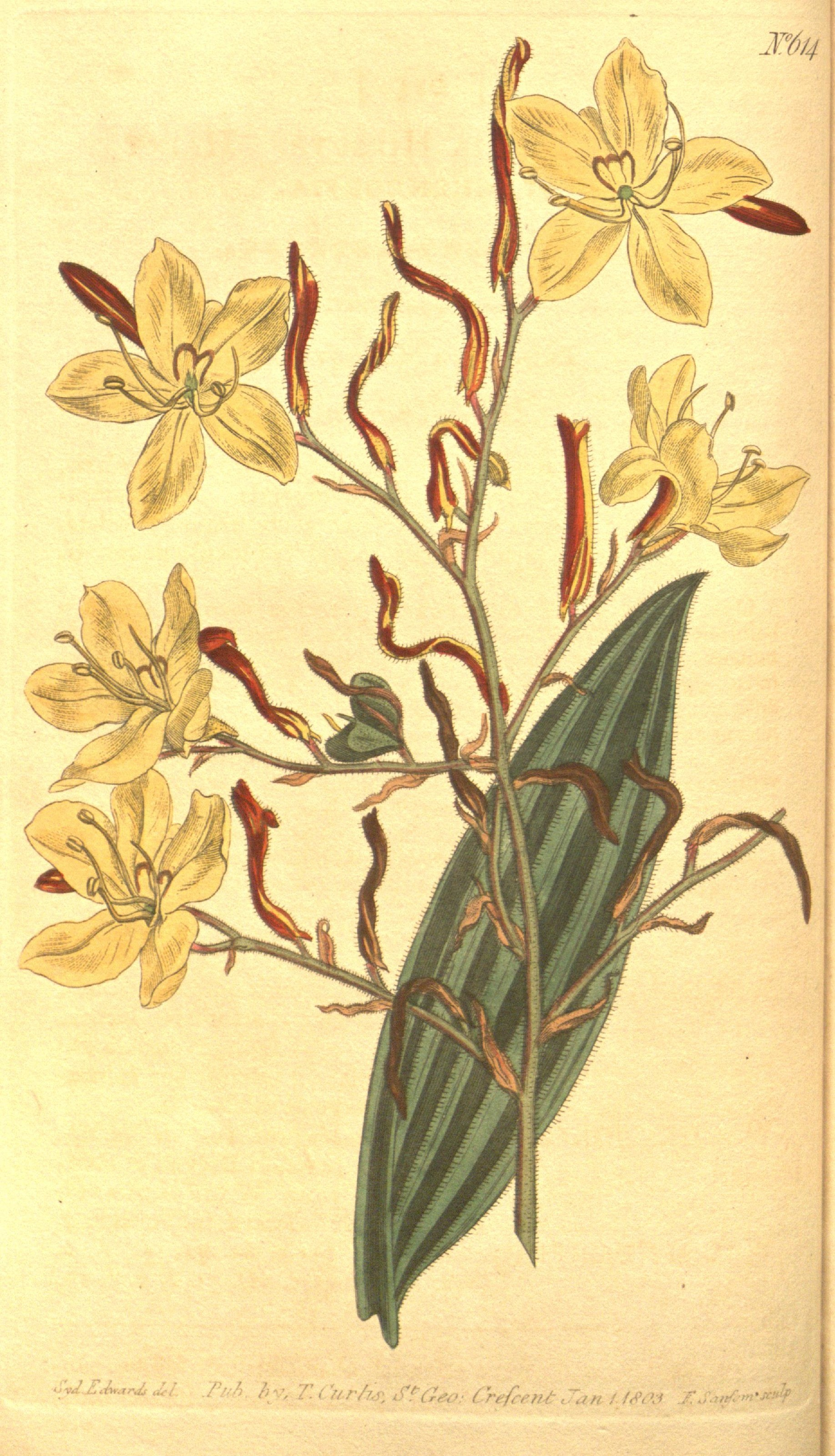
Etching in Curtis's Botanical Magazine (1803)

Koffiepit was first scientifically described by the Dutch botanist and physician Johannes Burman in 1757, who called it Wachendorfia paniculata. This description was based on a specimen that had been collected by Henrik Bernard Oldenland, between 1689 and 1697. In 1781, Carl Linnaeus the Younger distinguished a different specimen that he named W. graminifolia. John Bellenden Ker Gawler published in 1809 a description for W. brevifolia, that was named by Daniel Solander without a proper description. Carl Peter Thunberg renamed the specimen described by Linnaeus the Younger (in 1781), creating the invalid name W. graminea, and he also distinguished W. hirsuta and W. tenella, both in his book Flora Capensis - sistens plantas promontorii Bonæ Spei Africes - secundum systema sexuale emendatum of 1811. William Herbert distinguished W. paniculata var. β in Curtis's Botanical Magazine vol. 53 in 1826, which was raised to the status of species by Robert Sweet, who called it W. herbertii. In their 1992 revision of the genus Wachendorfia, Nick Helme and Hans Peter Linder conclude that all these names should be treated as synonyms because W. paniculata is a very variable species, which shows the characters that should distinguish between the different taxa in all combinations.

=== Phylogeny ===
Comparison of homologous DNA has increased the insight in the phylogenetic relationships between the species of Wachendorfia. The following tree represents those insights.

- genus Wachendorfia
  - W. thyrsiflora
  - - - W. brachyandra
      - W. multiflora
    - Wachendorfia paniculata

== Distribution, ecology and conservation ==
Koffiepit may be found from Nieuwoudtville in the southwest of the Northern Cape province to Port Elizabeth on the coast of the Eastern Cape province of South Africa. It mostly occurs on sandy soils that developed from the weathering of Table Mountain Sandstone, but it also can be found on alluvial sands, granitic soils, and clay that developed from Malmesbury shales. It occurs from sea level to approximately 1,700 m (5,600 ft) altitude. It grows in permanently moist shales, but also on moderately to very dry soils in fynbos on both acid and alkaline sands, and can be present in strandveld and renosterveld. It flowers mostly in younger vegetation, within several years after the last fire, probably because it favours an open vegetation. The system with the style bent to one side, and two of the three stamens to the other side is thought to be an adaptation that enhances cross-pollination. It is considered to be a least-concern species, due to its stable population trend.
