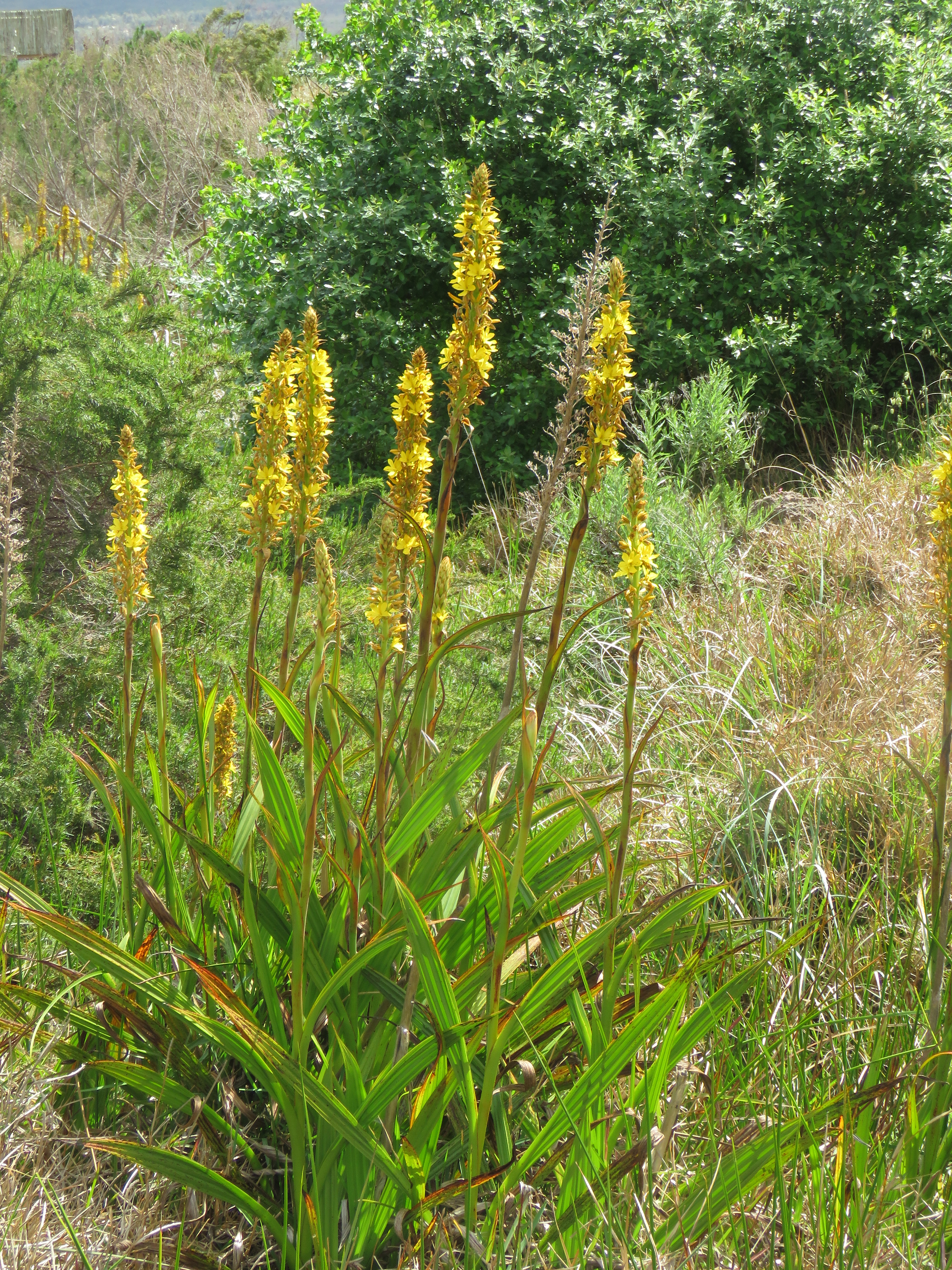
- Wachendorfia thyrsiflora
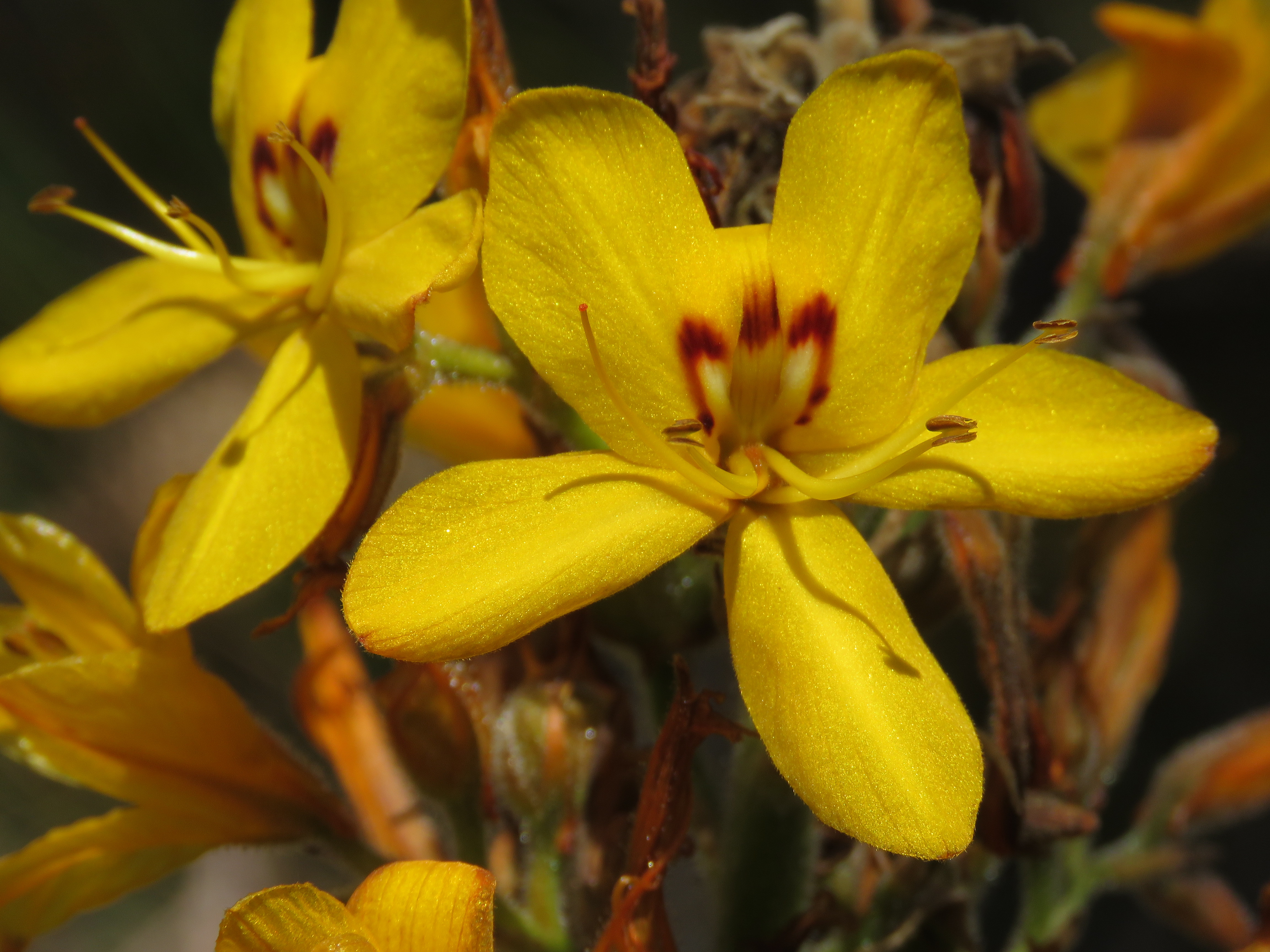

Scientific classification
- Kingdom: Plantae
- Clade: Embryophytes
- Clade: Tracheophytes
- Clade: Angiosperms
- Clade: Monocots
- Clade: Commelinids
- Order: Commelinales
- Family: Haemodoraceae
- Subfamily: Haemodoroideae
- Genus: Wachendorfia; Burm., 1757, not Loefl. 1758 (Commelinaceae)

Species
- Wachendorfia brachyandra W.F.Barker; Wachendorfia multiflora (Klatt) J.C.Manning & Goldblatt; Wachendorfia paniculata Burm.; Wachendorfia thyrsiflora Burm.

Synonyms
- Pedilonia C.Presl

= Wachendorfia =

Genus of flowering plants

Wachendorfia is a genus of perennial herbaceous plants that is assigned to the bloodroot family. The plants have a perennial rootstock with red sap. From the rootstock emerge lance- or line-shaped, sometime sickle-shaped, pleated, simple leaves set in a fan, that are flattened to create a left and right surface rather than an upper and lower surface. The leaves die when the seeds are shed in three of the species, and are perennial in one species.

The rootstock also produces flowering stems annually that carry a panicle of zygomorphic, yellow or yellowish flowers in two distinct forms, one with the style and one stamen bent to the right and two stamens to the left, and the other vice versa. The fruit opens with three valves and each contains a single, hairy seed. All species only occur in the fynbos biome in the Cape Provinces of South Africa.

== Description ==
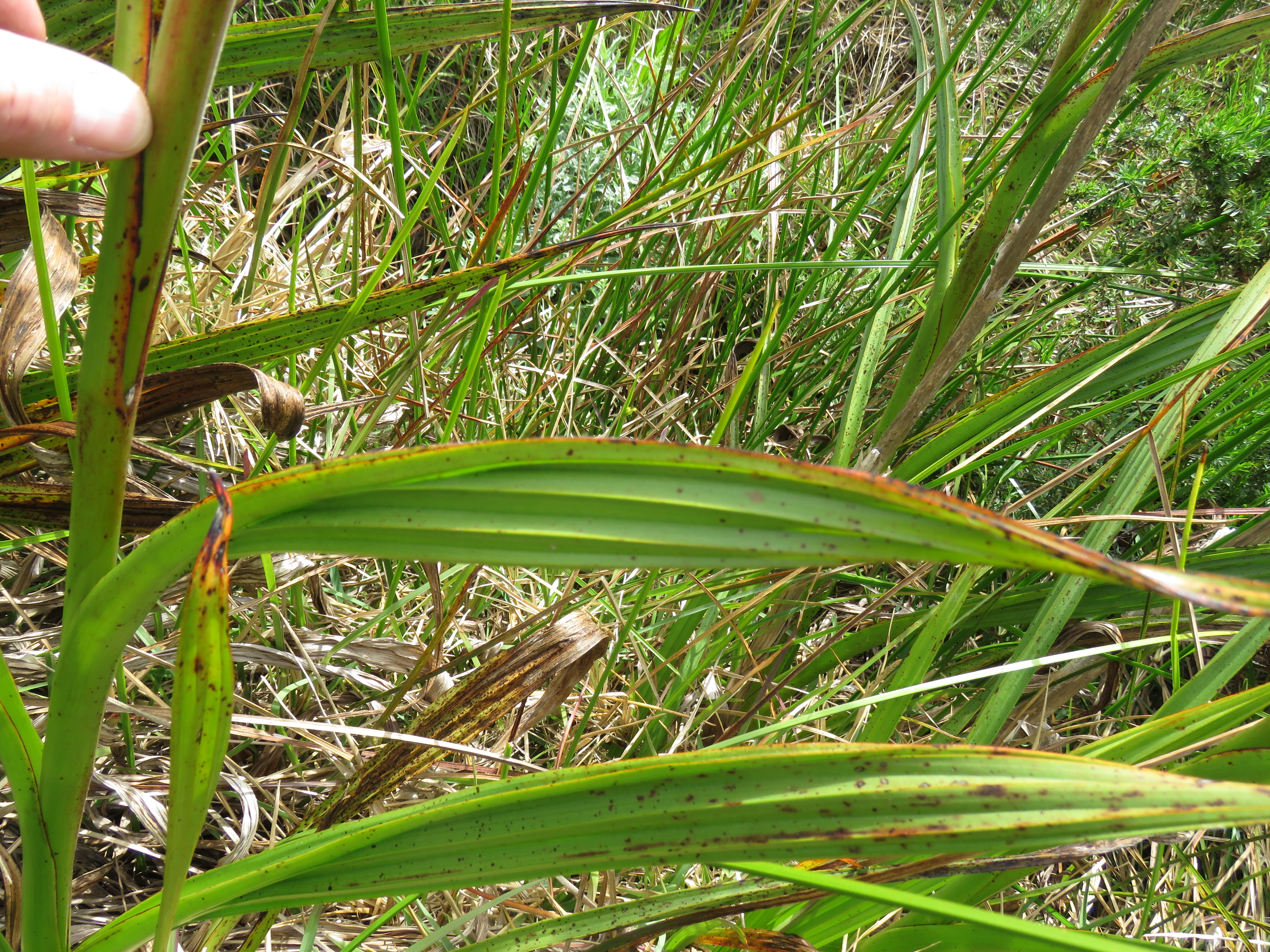
Pleated leaves on the stem of W. thyrsiflora

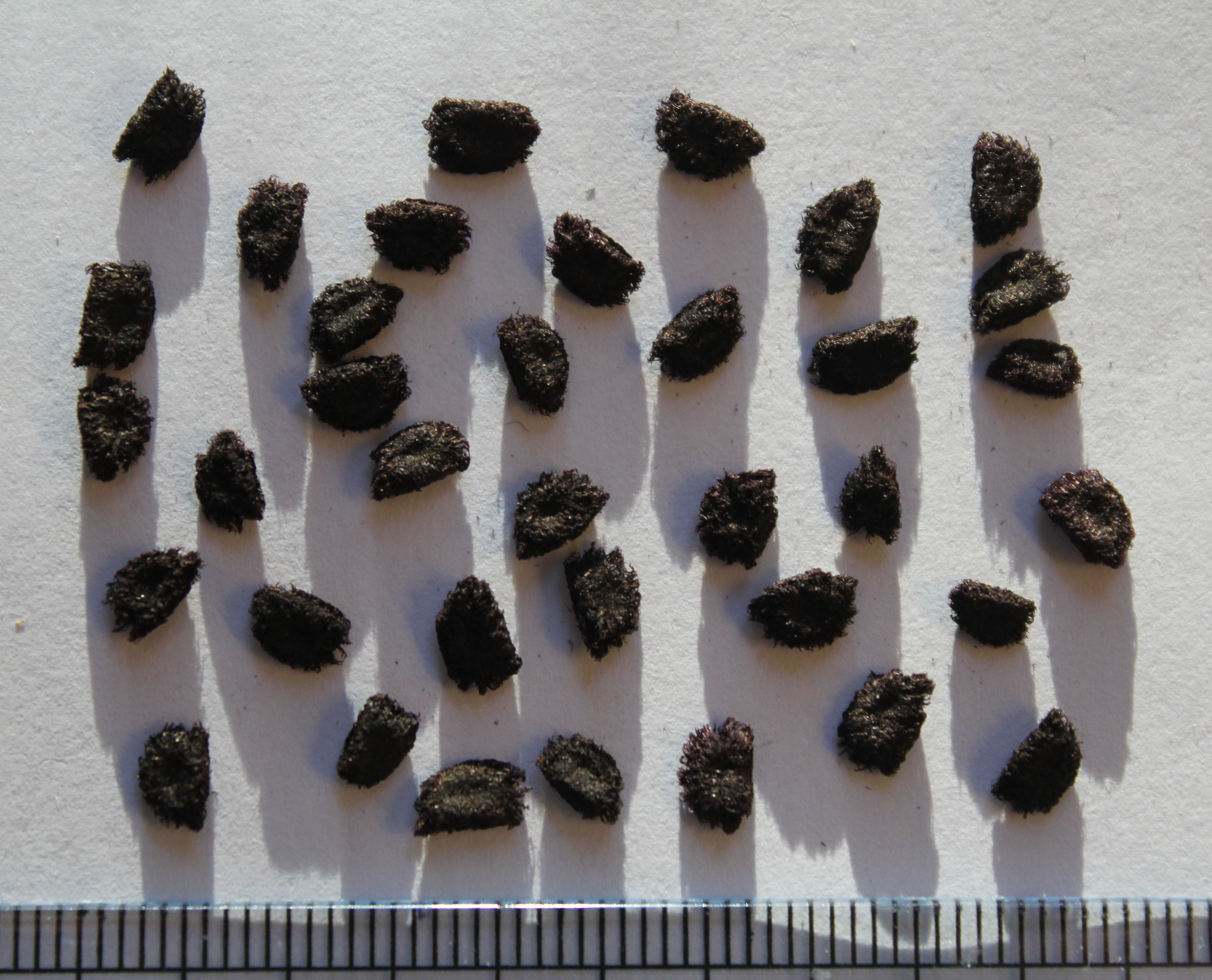
W. thyrsiflora seeds

Wachendorfia is a genus of perennial herbaceous plants of 10–250 cm (0.33–8.20 ft) high when flowering, which emerge from a fleshy, bright red-coloured, rounded, egg-shaped to cylindrical underground rootstock. Three species become dormant for the dry, hot summer, surviving with their rootstocks, but one species (W. thyrsiflora) is evergreen. Flowering stems emerge from the bud at the tip of the rootstock. Each of the three side buds may grow into a new rootstock. The roots are thin and adventitious, clustering around the nodes between the old and the new rhizomes.

The leaf bases form a tunic around the old rhizome. The leaves together form a fan-like structure, are 0.1–0.9 m (0.33–2.95 ft) long, erect or spreading, simple and entire, line- to lance-shaped, sometimes sickle-shaped, have a firm texture, are flattened sideways as to produce left and right surfaces, not upper and lower surfaces and are always pleated along their length. The leaves are green or yellowish green, in W. thyrsiflora and W. brachyandra always hairless, but those in W. multiflora and W. paniculata may be hairless or roughly hairy. The base of the lower leaves form a sheath around the base of the inflorescence stem. Three leaves grow from the rootstock, and a variable number emerges from the stem. The lower pair of stem leaves are opposite and envelop the stem at their base; higher stem leaves are arranged in a spiral and do not envelop the stem. Wachendorfia has so-called paracytic stomata.

The inflorescence stem of 0.1–2.5 m (0.33–8.20 ft) high dies down each year after flowering. The inflorescence is a lax to dense deltoid or a dense cylindrical panicle, with a herbaceous, cylindrical to angular axis that is covered in short hairs which become glandular nearer to the tips. The bracts in the inflorescence have a pointy tip, are usually glandularly hairy, and are dry, brown and papery in three species and herbaceous in W. multiflora, erect or with their tips recurved. The perianth is pale apricot to pale or golden yellow, strongly zygomorphic and consists of six subequal, spreading, oblong tepals, set in two whorls. The lower three tepals are free, and the upper three are united at their base where they are adorned with small dark and light markings that apparently function as a nectar guide. Two open spur-like nectaries are present between the base of the outer upper tepals and the adjacent inner tepals. The outer tepals are hairy on the outside, especially the upper one.

There are three stamens opposite the inner tepals. Their filaments are free, line-shaped, curving downward from the base and upwards towards the tip. The lateral filaments are longer and carry a smaller anther than the lowest stamen. The lowest filament turns sideways in the opposite direction of the style. The anthers on top of each filament are oval to arrow-shaped, open with slits opposite the side where the filament is attached, over the length of both lobes. The pollen is boat-shaped, with one furrow. The style is thread-shaped, bent left or right consistently in any one plant and carries a minute head-like stigma. The ovary is attached above the attachment of the other floral parts; it consists of three compartments that each contain one ovule attached to the centre and develops into a softly hairy, mostly glandular, sharply three-lobed dry capsule that is wider than high. The seed is oval to globular, approximately 2 mm (0.079 in) in diameter, densely covered in hair, and brown in colour, at least in W. paniculata, the only species for which it has been recorded.

=== Differences between the species ===
W. thyrsiflora is a large to very large, 0.6–2 m (2.0–6.6 ft) high, evergreen herb with golden yellow flowers that have diverging stamens and style of at least two thirds as long as the tepals, in a dense spiky inflorescence high above the leaves, and dry, brownish and membranous bracts recurved at the tip, with leaves mostly much wider than 1.5 cm (0.59 in). It is restricted to damp environments.

W. paniculata is a small to large, 0.1–0.9 m (0.33–2.95 ft), deciduous herb with apricot, yellow or orange flowers that have diverging stamens and style of at least two thirds as long as the tepals that are 13–31 mm (0.51–1.22 in) long and 4–16 mm (0.16–0.63 in) wide, in a lax to dense panicle with brown, dry and membranous bracts that recurve at the tip with age, with leaves narrower than 2 cm (0.79 in) and shorter than the inflorescence, and that may grow in dry and wetter circumstances.

W. brachyandra has apricot to pale yellow flowers in a lax panicle that is longer than the leaves, clustered stamens, which are, like the style, less than half the length of the tepals.

W. multiflora is a small plant of up to 25 cm (9.8 in) high, with leaves that are usually longer than the very short and dense inflorescence, with green, erect bracts, dull yellow, later purplish brown flowers with narrow tepals, 15–25 mm (0.59–0.98 in) long and 3–6 mm (0.12–0.24 in) wide.

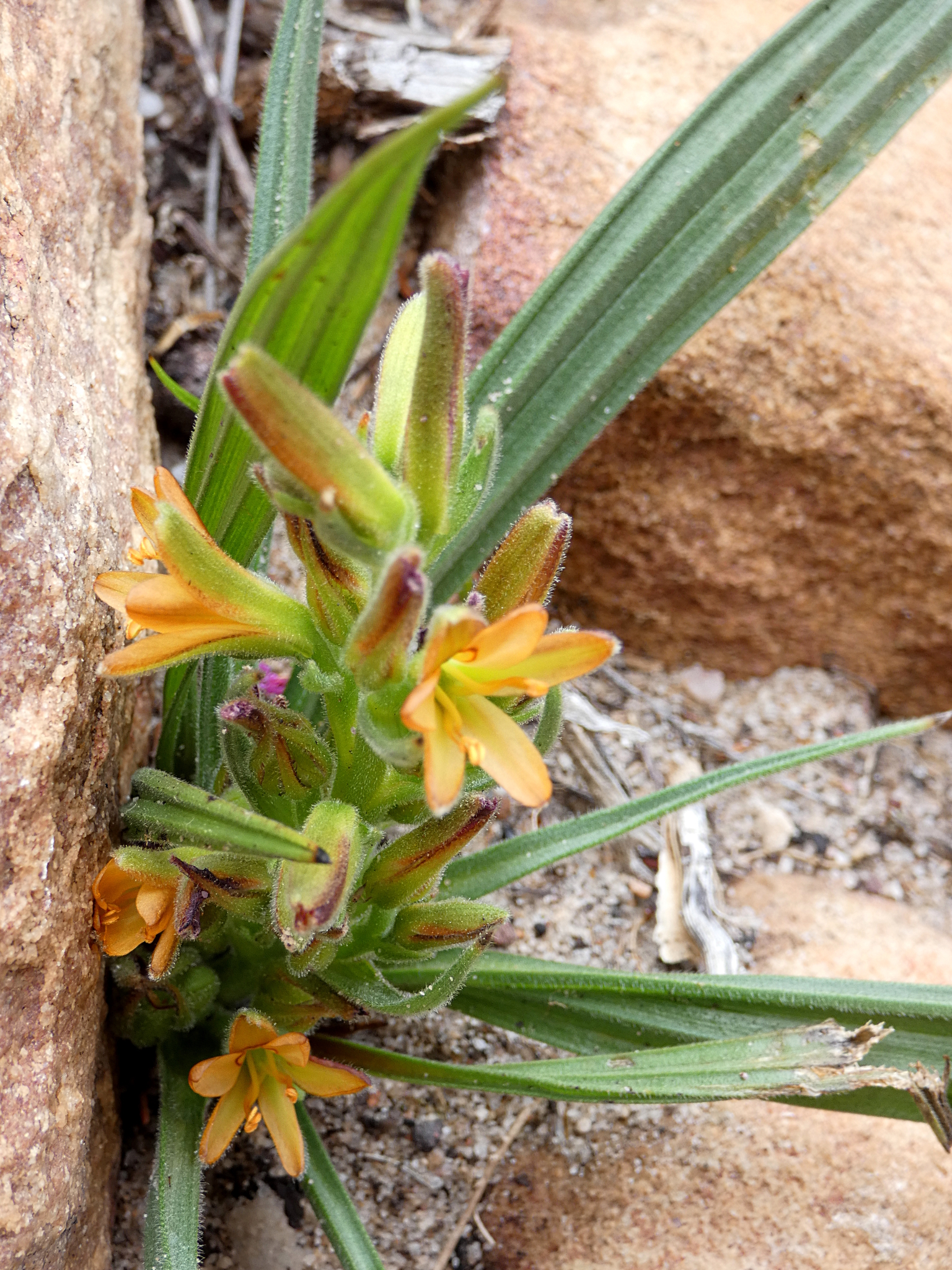
W. multiflora

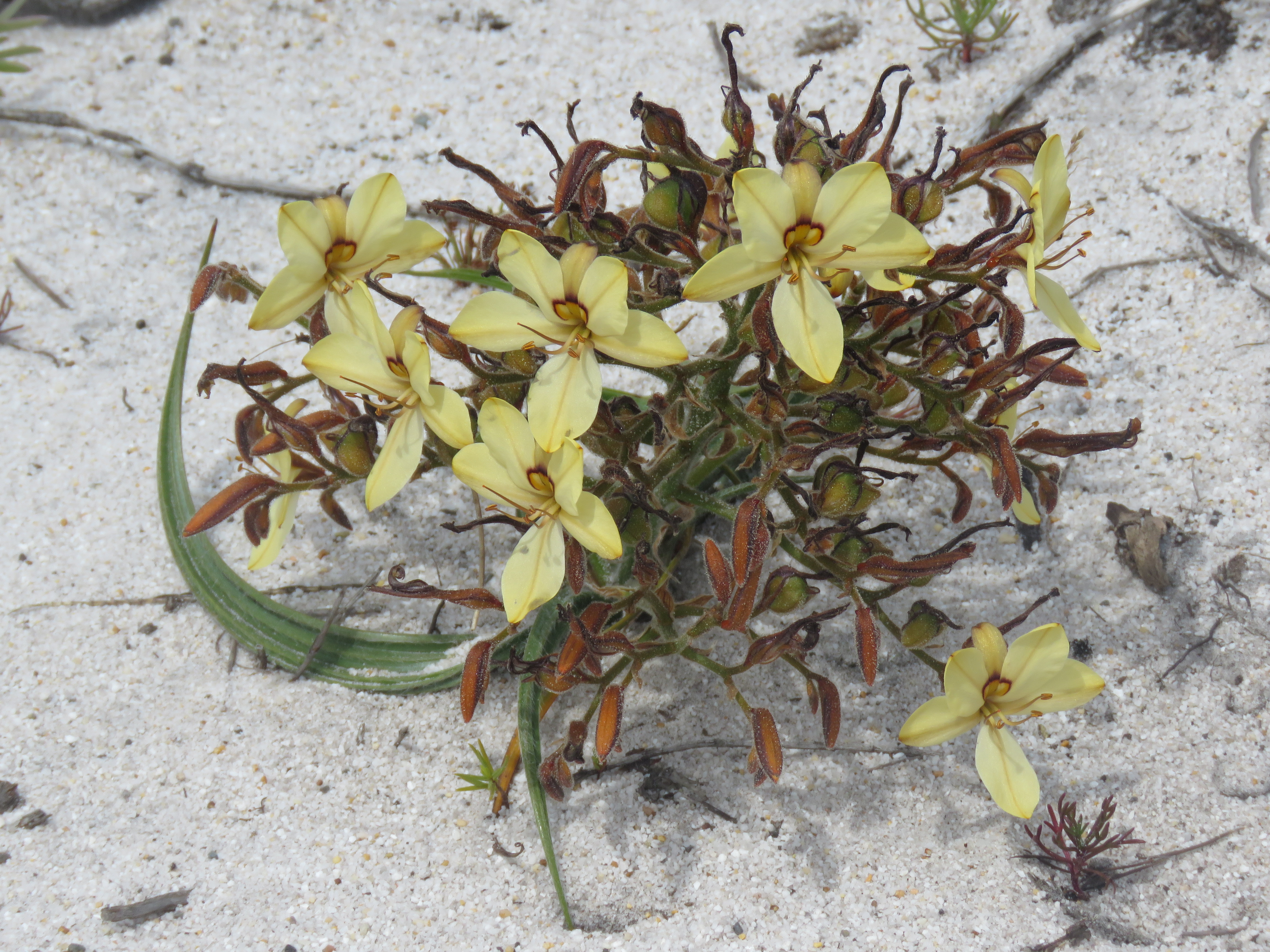
W. paniculata

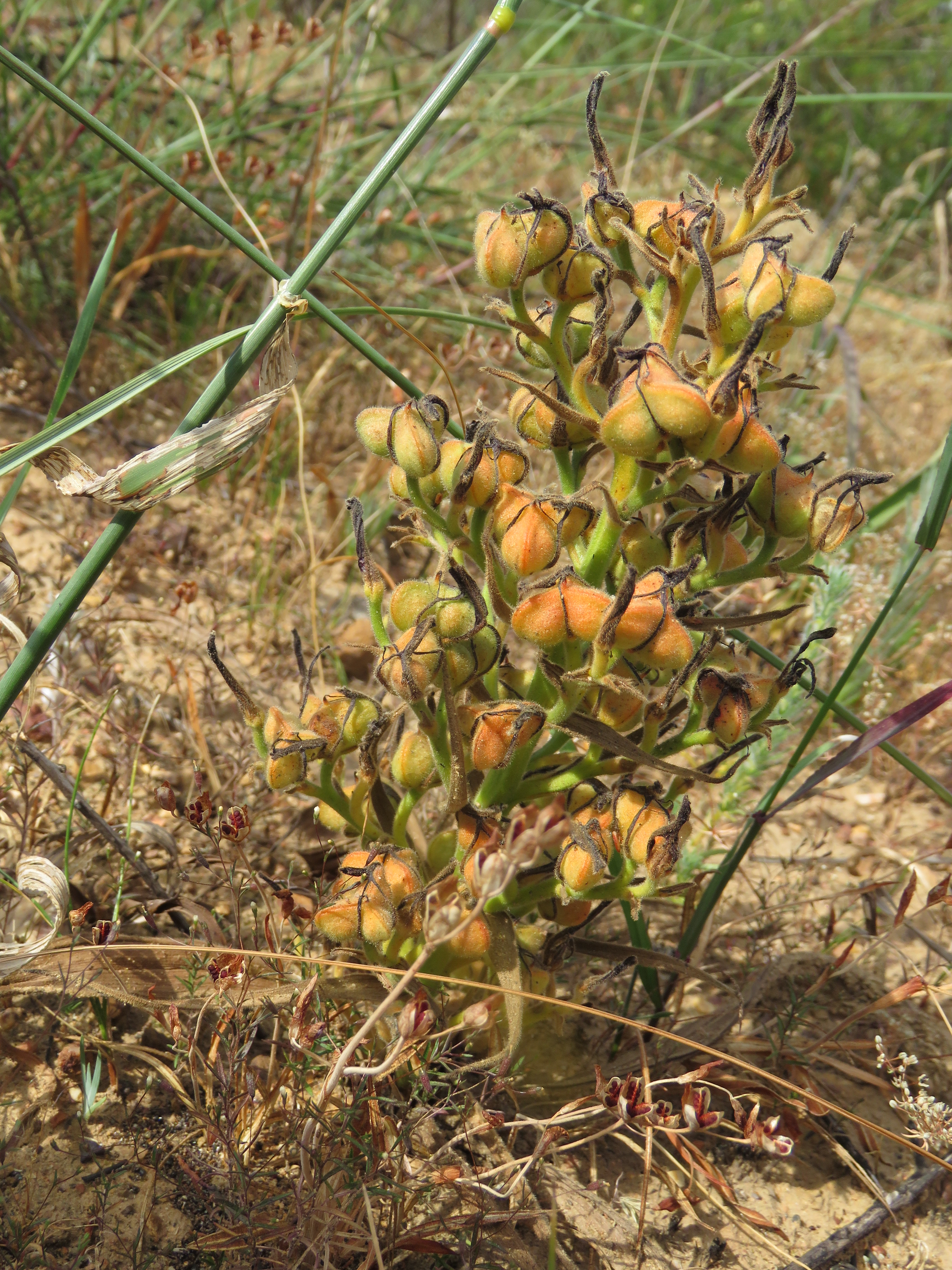
W. paniculata fruiting

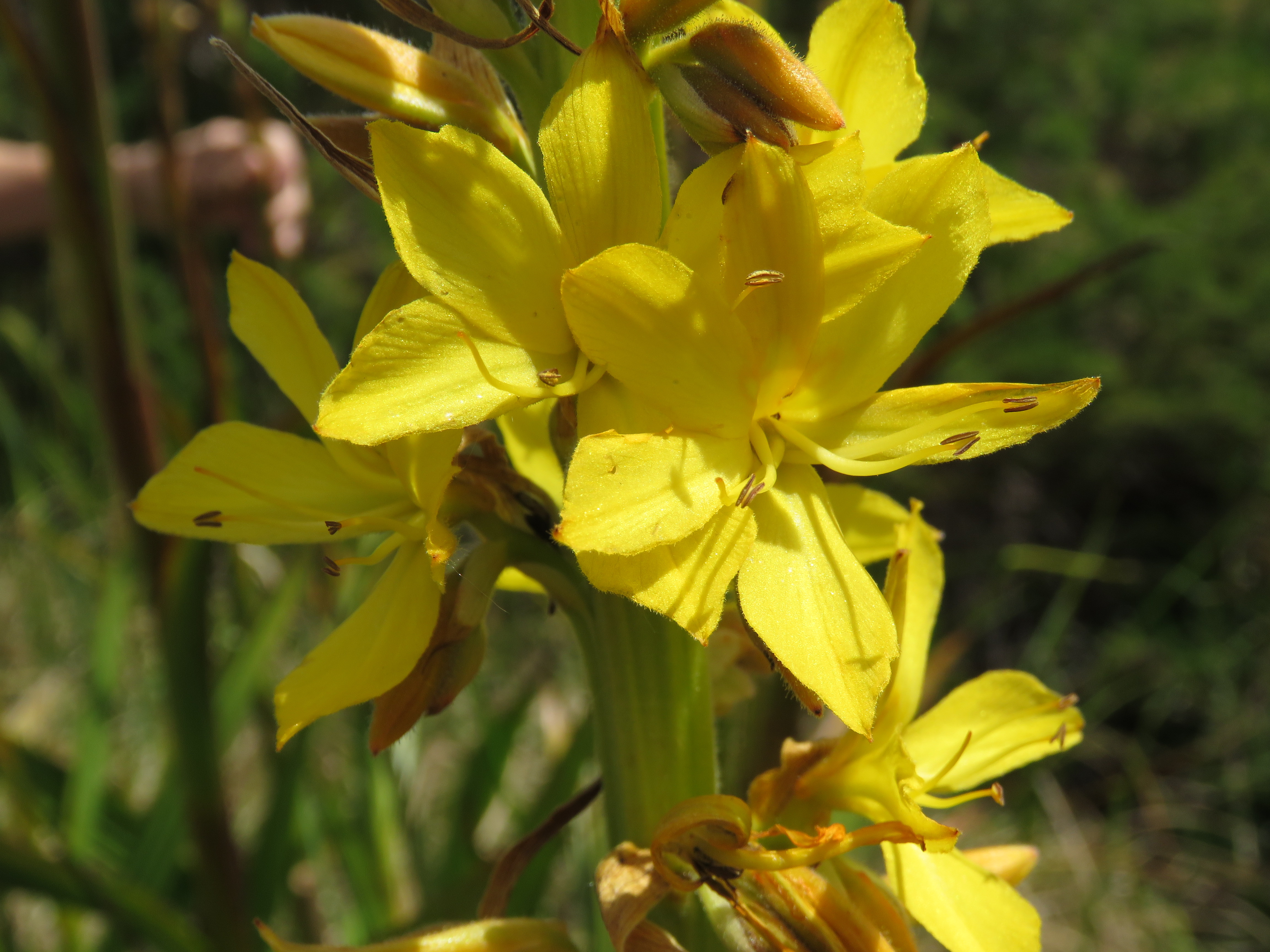
W. thyrsiflora flower

== Taxonomy ==
The first description of a species of butterfly-lily was already published in 1700 by the English botanist Leonard Plukenet in his book Almagesti botanici mantissa. He named it Erythrobulbus. The description was probably based on a collection of W. thyrsiflora made by Henrik Bernard Oldenland between 1689 and 1697. In 1739, Johann Philipp Breyne described and illustrated what is undoubtedly a Wachendorfia, giving it the name Asphodelus latifolius in his book Prodromus fasciculi rariorum plantarum, but these names predate the start of Linnaean taxonomy in 1753 and are therefore invalid. Johannes Burman described both W. thyrsiflora and W. paniculata in his monography of the genus Wachendorfia in 1757. Pehr Löfling had already assigned the name Wachendorfia to a genus in the Commelinaceae, but his work was published only two years after his death in 1756 by Linnaeus, and therefore, Burman's name has priority, and Löfling's homonym was replaced by Callisia.

Carl Peter Thunberg, who visited the Cape from 1772 to 1775, collected additional specimens of Wachendorfia, and Carl Linnaeus the Younger described some of these as W. graminifolia in 1781. Thunberg renamed the specimens described by Linnaeus, creating the invalid name W. graminea. Richard Anthony Salisbury created the names W. elata, W. humilis, W. pallida and W. brevifolia. Thunberg distinguished W. hirsuta and W. tenella, both in his 1811 book Flora Capensis - sistens plantas promontorii Bonæ Spei Africes - secundum systema sexuale emendatum. William Herbert distinguished W. paniculata var. β in Curtis's Botanical Magazine vol. 53 in 1826, which was raised to the status of species by Robert Sweet, who called it W. herbertii. In 1829, Karel Bořivoj Presl described Pedilonia violacea. Friedrich Wilhelm Klatt described Babiana multiflora in 1882. In 1949, Winsome Fanny Barker described W. brachyandra and W. parviflora (a later synonym of W. multiflora).

In their 1992 revision of the genus Wachendorfia, Nick Helme and Hans Peter Linder conclude that four species can be distinguished: W. thyrsiflora, W. paniculata, W. brachyandra and W. parviflora. John Manning and Peter Goldblatt recognised in 2000 that Babiana multiflora should be assigned to the genus Wachendorfia and so create the new combination W. multiflora. It has priority over its synonym W. parviflora because the original combination was published earlier. W. elata is a synonym of W. thyrsiflora, and all others should be treated as synonyms for W. paniculata, a very variable species, which shows a continuous intergrading of characters.

=== Names ===
The genus Wachendorfia is named in honor of Evert Jacob van Wachendorff, professor of botany and chemistry and later rector at the University of Utrecht in the 18th century.

=== Phylogeny ===
Comparison of homologous DNA has increased the insight in the phylogenetic relationships between the genera in the Haemodoroideae subfamily, and between the species of Wachendorfia. The following trees represent those insights.

- subfamily Haemodoroideae
  - - Dilatris
    - - Lachnanthes
      - Haemodorum
  - - - Xiphidium
      - Schiekia
    - - Barberetta
      - Wachendorfia

- genus Wachendorfia
  - B. thyrsiflora
  - - - W. brachyandra
      - W. multiflora
    - W. paniculata

== Ecology ==
The flowers of the species of Wachendorfia are enantiomorphic. The style is sometimes sharply deflected to the right, while in other plants it is bent to the left. In both morphs one of the three stamens is deflected to the same side as the style, whereas the remaining two curve in the opposite direction. This is thought to be a mechanism that enhances crosspollination and so boosts genetic diversity. Flowers of the species of Dilatris are also chirally dimorph, but here both left- and right-handed flowers are found on the same plants.

Two species, W. thyrsiflora and W. brachyandra, grow in permanently moist environments such as the banks of streams and seeps, whereas the other two, W. multiflora and W. paniculata, grow in locations that are dry, at least seasonally dry. All species flower during spring and early summer, but there are differences in flowering time. W. multiflora has its blooms in August and September. W. paniculata has a long flowering period, rather later at higher altitudes. W. thyrsiflora can often flower during summer, probably reflecting that it does not suffer from water-stress because it grows in permanently moist environments.

== Cultivation ==
Slightly frost hardy, Wachendorfias thrive outdoors in warm, near frost-free environments as an ornamental plant. Most require moist, well drained soils in a sunny position. Some are ideal for bog gardens. Propagation is via seed or division.
