= Henrik Bernard Oldenland =

South African artist and botanist (1663–1697)

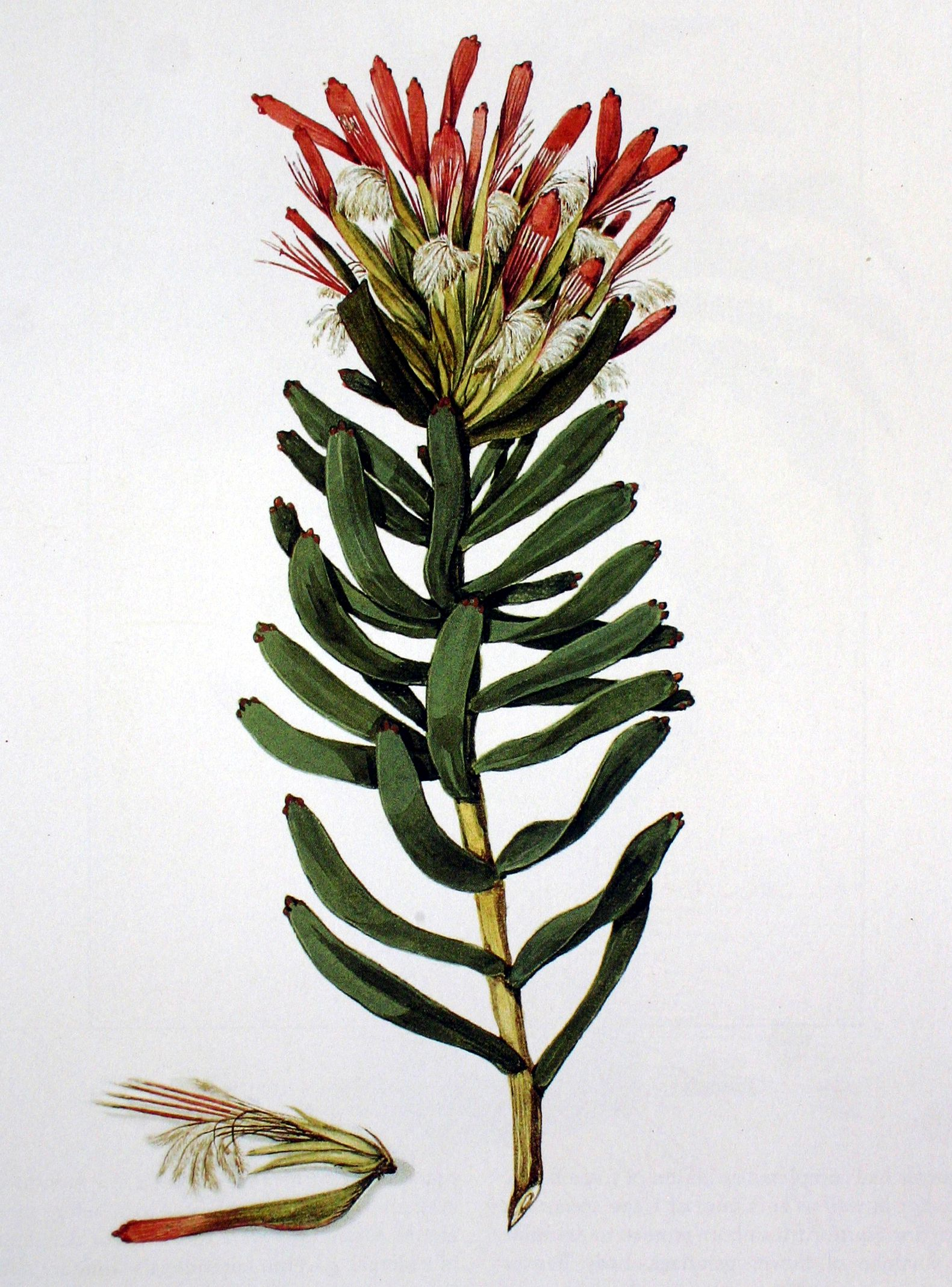
Mimetes cucullatus attributed to Henrik Oldenland

Henrik Bernard Oldenland, aka Heinrich Bernhard Oldenland (c. 1663 – 1697), was a Holy Roman Empire-born physician in the Dutch Cape Colony. He was also a botanist, painter and land surveyor, and is denoted by the author abbreviation Oldenl. when citing a botanical name.

Henrik was born in Lübeck, a son of Hans Oldenland and Anna Margaretha Nagel. He enrolled at Leiden University in May 1686, and studied medicine and botany for three years, coming under the influence of Paul Hermann who inspired an interest in botany. He arrived in the Cape Colony in 1688 in the service of the Dutch East India Company, and joined Isaq Schrijver's expedition from 4 January to 10 April 1689. Their route was from Cape Town through the present day towns of Caledon, Swellendam, Riversdale, over Attaquasberg eastwards to the vicinity of Uniondale, on to Willowmore, and finally to about 30 km north-west of Aberdeen. This was the first Cape expedition to penetrate so far into the interior, revealing large numbers of new and interesting plants. Some of these, like Aloe humilis, found their way back to the Company Garden in Cape Town.

In 1690 the Heeren XVII recommended that Simon van der Stel employ Oldenland to collect and grow medicinal herbs as he was a very good botanist who had studied medicine with great success. In the same letter they suggested that Jan Hartog be appointed in a similar capacity. As a result, Oldenland was given the positions of master-gardener and land-surveyor for the Government in 1693, and Hartog was to be his assistant. Since he now had an assured income, Oldenland could marry Margaretha Hendrina van Otteren, widow of the former garrison bookkeeper, Johann Heinrich Blum.

Backed by Simon van der Stel, Oldenland and Hartog invested an enormous amount of work in the Company Garden, turning it into an interesting attraction for foreign visitors. Oldenland also worked on a collection of pressed and mounted specimens, including a catalogue of Latin descriptions.

His untimely death at Cape Town in 1697 halted all his botanical work. His widow was married once more, to Hendrik Donker in 1700. After his death, Oldenland's collection was seen and admired by many visitors to the Cape, the first to mention it being Peter Kolbe who stayed at the Cape between 1705 and 1713 and published an account of this period in 1719 in Nuremberg entitled Caput Bonae Spei Hodiernum. In the book he lists indigenous and exotic plants growing there, acknowledging his sources as Hartog and the Herbarium vivum of the late Oldenland. A Herbarium vivum was a compilation of pressed useful plants, such as those having, for example, good timber, edible fruits, tubers and corms, often embellished by paintings and sketches, or inked impressions of leaves or flowers. François Valentijn, a Dutch minister and historian, visited the Cape on four occasions between 1685 and 1714, and wrote of seeing 13 or 14 volumes with copious notes in Latin on each plant. He also recorded that the specimens were unusually attractive, exceptionally well dried and expertly mounted.

Donker eventually disposed of the volumes in Holland as they next came into the possession of Johannes Burman, then professor of botany at the University of Amsterdam who drew upon the collection for his Thesaurus zeylanicus. Upon his death they passed to his son, Nicolaas Laurens Burman, who also succeeded him as professor of botany. Nicolaas visited Carl Linnaeus, taking along a large collection of Cape plants, including Oldenland's volumes. Linnaeus refers to Oldenland's work in his writings, pointing out that Oldenland was the second trained botanist to collect at the Cape, the first having been Paul Hermann, Oldenland's mentor.

The genus Oldenlandia L. in the Rubiaceae was named in his honour.
