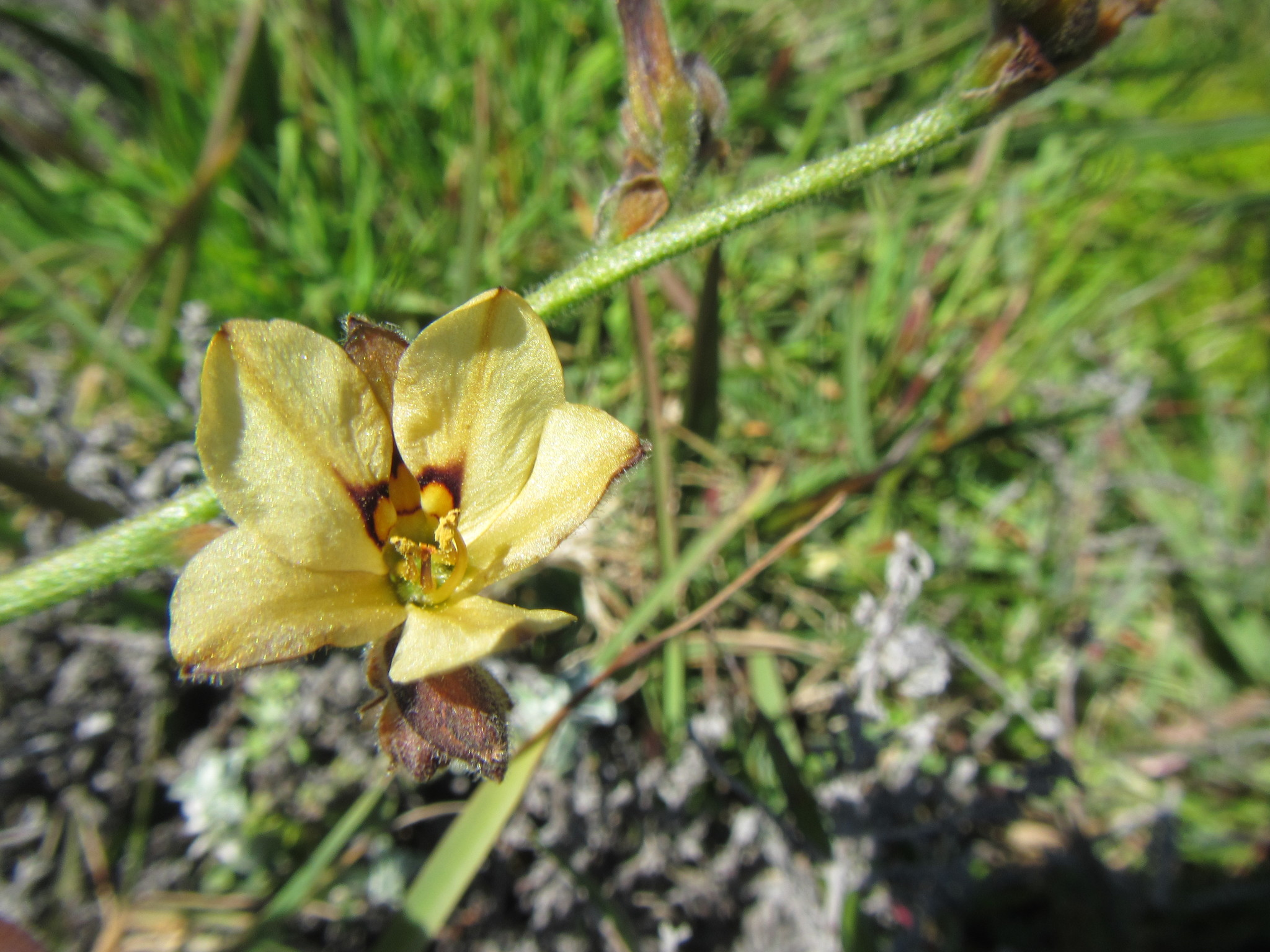

Scientific classification
- Kingdom: Plantae
- Clade: Tracheophytes
- Clade: Angiosperms
- Clade: Monocots
- Clade: Commelinids
- Order: Commelinales
- Family: Haemodoraceae
- Genus: Wachendorfia
- Species: W. brachyandra

Binomial name
- Wachendorfia brachyandra W.F.Barker, 1949

= Wachendorfia brachyandra =

Species of flowering plant

Wachendorfia brachyandra is a small to large, 10–65 cm (3.9–25.6 in) high, winter-growing, perennial herbaceous plant that grows from a rootstock, and has been assigned to the bloodroot family. Its simple, entire, line- to lance-shaped leaves that are usually shorter than the stem, and have pleated, laterally flattened leaf blades af about 35 mm (1.4 in) wide, meaning that there are left and right surfaces rather than upper and lower. The inflorescence is a lax panicle and at the base of each flowerstalk is a dry, brown and papery bract, and those higher in the panicle have a recurved tip. The mirror-symmetrical pale apricot-yellow flowers consist of six tepals and are adorned with brown markings on the upper three tepals. There are three anthers that are clustered and about half as long as the tepals. Each individual flower only lasts one day. Flowering occurs from August to December. This species grows in the wild in the Western Cape province of South Africa only, and is much less common than its relatives W. paniculata and W. thyrsiflora. It is sometimes called short-stamen butterfly-lily in English.

== Description ==
The short-stamen butterfly-lily is a perennial herbaceous plant of 10–65 cm (3.9–25.6 in) high that emerges from a small, globose to oval rootstock of 0.5–2 cm (0.20–0.79 in) in diameter. The plant dies-down during the dry, hot summer. Its line- to lance-shaped, straight or often sickle-shaped leaves of up to 70 cm (28 in) long and 3.5 cm (1.4 in) wide are upright or spreading, without hairs, and dark to yellowish green in colour. The flowering stem is about 3 mm (0.12 in) in diameter and coated in short glandular hairs. It is often less than 40 cm (16 in) high. The flowers are set in a lax, simple, seldom compound panicle with 6-17 flowers per peduncle. The peduncles and pedicels are slender, and the peduncles are short near tip of the inflorescence, but those at the base are much longer, up to 20 cm (7.9 in) long). The bracts are set with dense soft hairs, up to 8 cm (3.1 in) long, mostly dry, brown and papery, oval to elongated with parallel sides and with a pointy tip, almost completely enclosing the pedicels, and without recurved tips lower down. The zygomorphic perianth consists of six light apricot to yellow tepals of 12–20 mm (0.47–0.79 in) long and 4–14 mm (0.16–0.55 in) wide, in two whorls of three, with dark markings on the upper three tepals. The upper tepal id smaller than the others and only slightly recurved. The margin of the tepals is only rarely adorned with a row of equally long hairs at regular intervals. Unique for this Wachendorfia species is that the three stamens are clustered, not spreading, and at 6–14 mm (0.24–0.55 in) only about half as long as tepals. The anthers are 2.0–2.5 mm (0.079–0.098 in) long and 0.5–1.0 mm (0.020–0.039 in) wide. The style is also short at 7–12 mm (0.28–0.47 in) long and only somewhat curved sideways. The fruit is dry capsule with three lobes that is about 5 mm (0.20 in) wide and 8–10 mm (0.31–0.39 in) wide. The seeds are spherical in shape, about 2 mm (0.079 in) in diameter and covered in coarse hairs.

=== Differences from related species ===
Wachendorfia brachyandra differs from W. thyrsiflora, which is a large to very large, 0.6–2 m (2.0–6.6 ft) high, evergreen herb with golden yellow flowers in a dense spiky inflorescence, with leaves mostly much wider than 1.5 cm (0.59 in), and that is restricted to damp environments (not a small to large plant with apricot to pale yellow flowers in a lax panicle, clustered stamens, which are like the style less than half the length of the tepals. W. multiflora is a smaller plant of up to 25 cm (9.8 in) high, with leaves that are usually longer than the very short and dense inflorescence, with green, erect bracts, dull yellow, later purplish brown flowers with narrow tepals, 15–25 mm (0.59–0.98 in) long and 3–6 mm (0.12–0.24 in) wide. W. paniculata is a small to large plant of 10–65 cm high, the inflorescence usually longer than the leaves, with brown and papery bracts that often have recurved tips, and apricot to yellow or orange flowers with wide tepals of 13–31 mm (0.51–1.22 in) long and 4–16 mm (0.16–0.63 in) wide).

== Taxonomy ==
The short-stamen butterfly-lily was first distinguished by South African botanist Winsome Fanny Barker in 1949. No synonyms are known. The genus Wachendorfia is named in honor of Evert Jacob van Wachendorff, professor of botany and chemistry and later rector at the University of Utrecht in the 18th century. The name of the species brachyandra is compounded from the Ancient Greek βραχύς (brachys), meaning "short" and ἀνδρός (andros), "male's", a reference to the relatively short stamens.

=== Phylogeny ===
Comparison of homologous DNA has increased the insight in the phylogenetic relationships between the species of Wachendorfia. The following tree represents those insights.

- genus Wachendorfia
  - W. thyrsiflora
  - - W. paniculata
    - - W. multiflora
      - Wachendorfia brachyandra

== Distribution, ecology and conservation ==
The short-stamen butterfly-lily can be found on the west coast of the Western Cape province of South Africa between Saldanha in the north and the Cape Peninsula in the south, and inland as far as Franschhoek. It grows in seasonally moist sandstone or granite soils, at 50–650 m (160–2,130 ft) altitude, in an area with predominant precipitation during the winter half year. It mostly occurs in the following vegetation types: Boland Granite Fynbos, Cape Flats Sand Fynbos, Peninsula Granite Fynbos, Saldanha Granite Strandveld, Swartland Alluvium Fynbos, Swartland Granite Renosterveld, and Swartland Silcrete Renosterveld. It is considered a vulnerable species.
