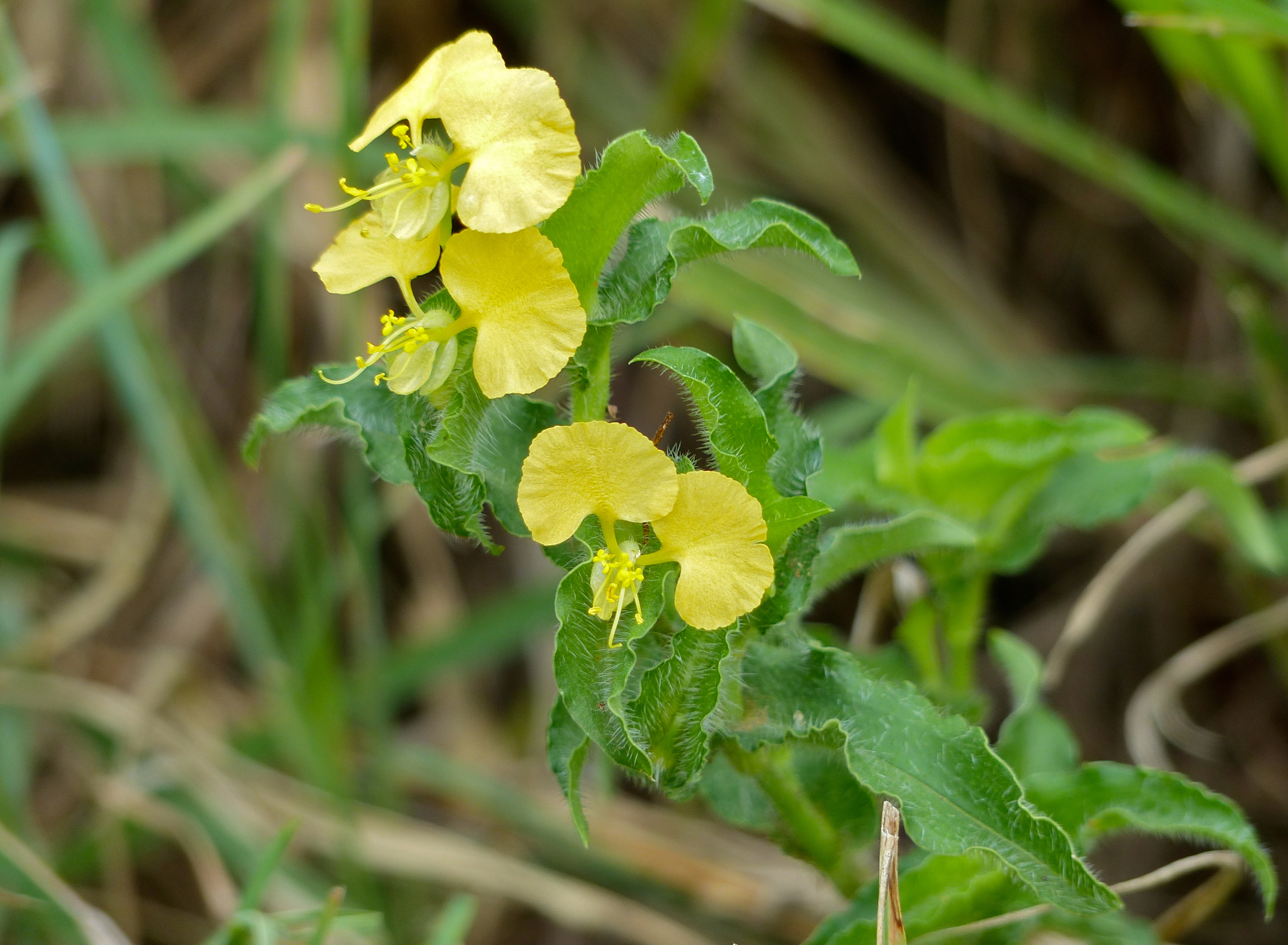
- Flowers
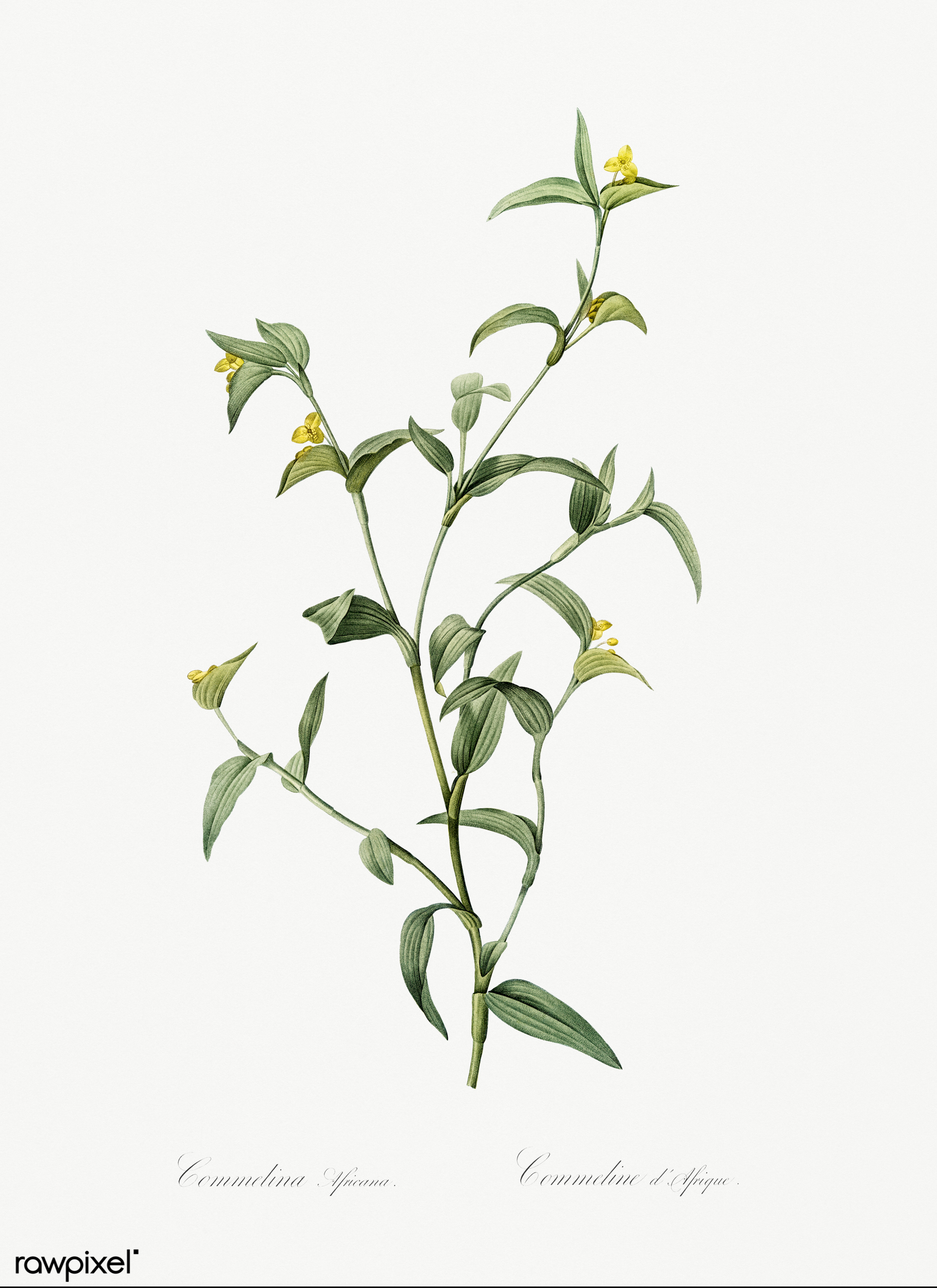
- Botanical illustration

Scientific classification
- Kingdom: Plantae
- Clade: Tracheophytes
- Clade: Angiosperms
- Clade: Monocots
- Clade: Commelinids
- Order: Commelinales
- Family: Commelinaceae
- Genus: Commelina
- Species: C. africana

Binomial name
- Commelina africana L.

Synonyms
- List: Commelina angolensis C.B.Clarke; Commelina benghalensis Forssk.; Commelina boehmiana K.Schum.; Commelina buchananii C.B.Clarke; Commelina cordifolia A.Rich.; Commelina dinteri Mildbr.; Commelina divaricata Vahl; Commelina edulis A.Rich.; Commelina elliotii C.B.Clarke & Rendle ex Scott Elliot; Commelina flava Salisb.; Commelina involucrosa A.Rich.; Commelina karooica C.B.Clarke; Commelina kirkii C.B.Clarke; Commelina krebsiana Kunth; Commelina lutea Cordem.; Commelina lutea Moench; Commelina lyallii (C.B.Clarke) H.Perrier; Commelina mannii C.B.Clarke; Commelina polyclada Welw. ex C.B.Clarke; Commelina subamplectens Hassk.; Dirtea africana (L.) Raf.; Hedwigia africana (L.) Medik.; Stickmannia africana (L.) Raf.

= Commelina africana =

Species of flowering plant

Commelina africana, the common yellow commelina, is a widespread species of flowering plant in the family Commelinaceae. It is native to Sub‑Saharan Africa, Madagascar, Réunion, and the Arabian Peninsula, and has been introduced to India. It is occasionally consumed as a leaf vegetable, and occasionally fed to rabbits and pigs.

== Subtaxa ==
The following subtaxa are accepted:

- Commelina africana subsp. africana
- Commelina africana var. glabriuscula (Norl.) Brenan – Southern Africa, Rift Valley
- Commelina africana var. karooica (C.B.Clarke) Govaerts – Namibia, Botswana, South Africa
- Commelina africana var. krebsiana (Kunth) C.B.Clarke – Namibia, Botswana, South Africa, Mozambique, Zimbabwe, Comoros
- Commelina africana var. lancispatha C.B.Clarke – Sierra Leone, eastern, central and southern Africa
- Commelina africana var. milleri Brenan – Namibia, Botswana, Northern Provinces, Zimbabwe, Zambia, Malawi, Kenya, Tanzania, Uganda
- Commelina africana var. villosior (C.B.Clarke) Brenan – Most of range
- Commelina africana subsp. zanzibarica Faden – Kenya, Tanzania, and introduced to India
