= Nicolaas Laurens Burman =

Dutch botanist (1734–1793)

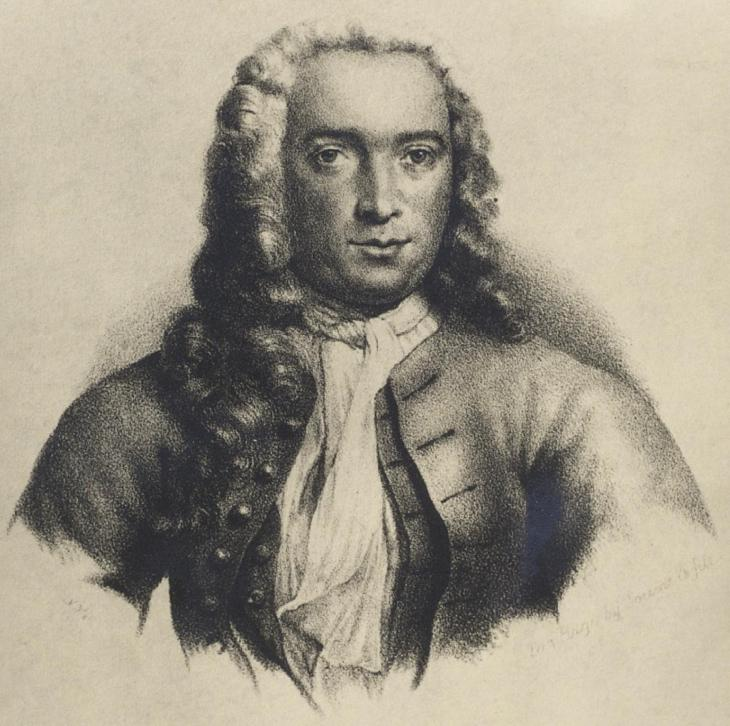

Nicolaas Laurens Burman (27 December 1734 – 11 September 1793) was a Dutch botanist.

He was the son of Johannes Burman (1707–1780). He succeeded his father to the chair of botany at the Athenaeum Illustre of Amsterdam., and at the Hortus Botanicus. He continued the correspondence with Carl Linnaeus, joining him at the University of Uppsala in 1760. He is the author of numerous works including Specimen botanicum de geraniis (1759) and Flora Indica (1768) which was later completed by Johann Gerhard Koenig (1728–1785).

== Works ==
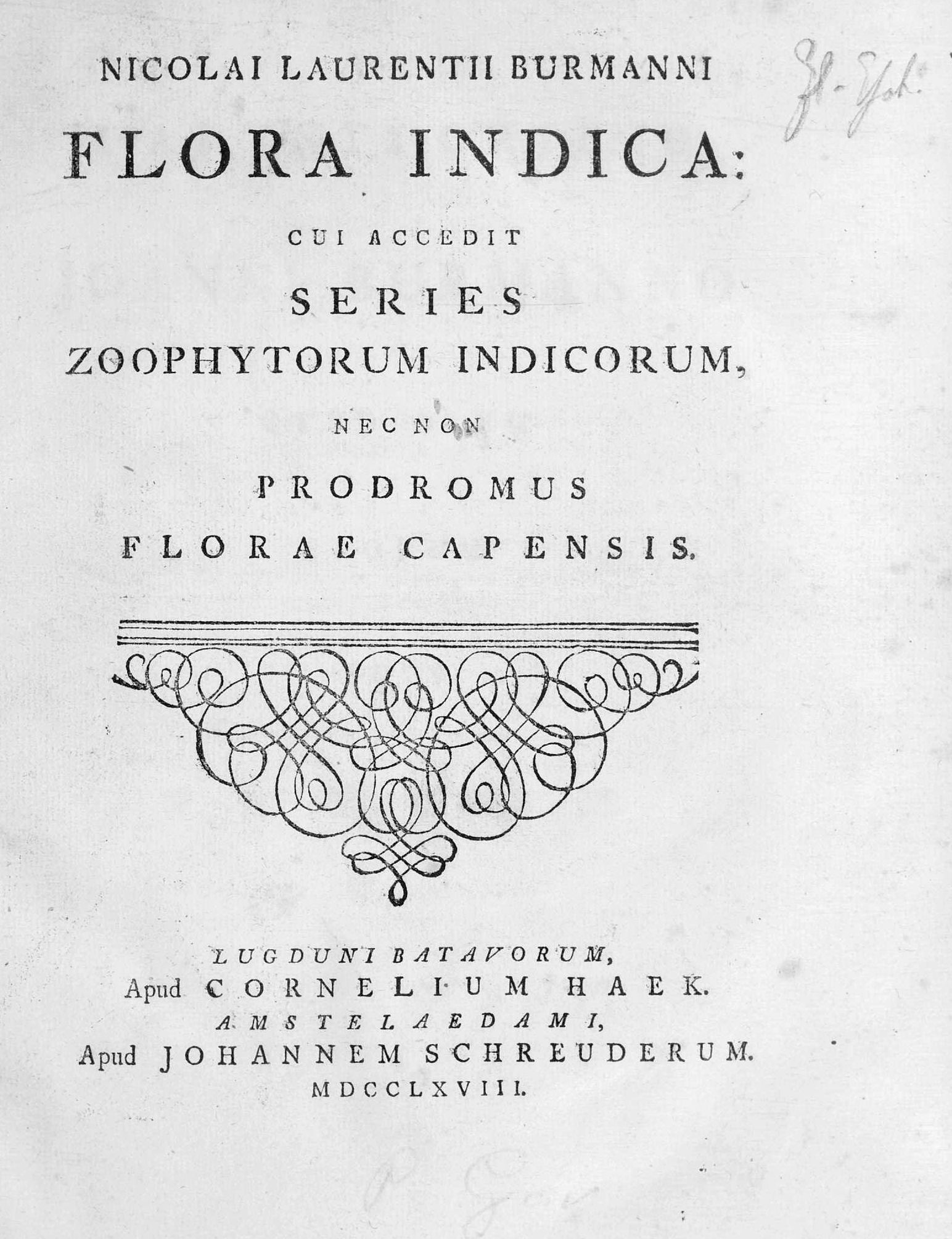
Flora indica, 1768

- Flora indica (in Latin). Leiden: Cornelius Haek. 1768.
