= Isaq Schrijver =

Isaq Schrijver (fl. 1689 – 1705/06) was a Dutch ensign and explorer of southern Africa. Although born and raised in Leiden, both his parents were born near Aachen, Germany. Little else is known of his origins, but by 1667 he was a marine.

In February 1684, Schrijver, then a sergeant in the Dutch East India Company and stationed at the Cape, headed a reconnaissance expedition into Namaqualand. They went as far north as Garies and brought back samples of copper ore to Cape Town.

Schrijver was involved in salvage operations of the Nossa Senhora dos Milagros which had run aground on the night of 16 April 1686 at Struisbaai near Cape Agulhas. This was a Portuguese vessel with 150 crew, commanded by Don Emmanual Da Silva, en route from Goa to Portugal and bearing diplomatic gifts from Narai, King of Siam to Pedro, King of Portugal, Louis XIV of France and Charles II of England. Also aboard were three Siamese ambassadors who were left to fend for themselves by the crew. Two were found in a desperate state a month after the wreck, the third having succumbed. Simon van der Stel sent a party consisting of lieutenant Olof Bergh, Isaq Schrijver and others to salvage what they could. Very little of any value was returned to the governor, but rumours of theft of the treasure soon started circulating, substantiated by the attempted sale of items to Cape Town residents and the unearthing in Olof Bergh's garden of a box holding objects from the wreck. Bergh later confessed to the theft and alleged that van der Stel himself was involved. Bergh was sentenced to three and a half years on Robben Island while Schrijver was cleared of any wrongdoing.

On 4 January 1689, two years after being promoted to the rank of ensign, Schrijver embarked on his most enterprising expedition. His orders were to barter cattle with the Inqua Hottentots of the Eastern Cape. He set off with a party of about 20 well-armed soldiers and 2 wagons on a trip which would cover about 1600 km. Also in the party was Heinrich Bernhard Oldenland (1663–99), an able botanist and expert on herbs, who had studied medicine for 3 years at Leiden University, and who would in 1693 be appointed as master gardener in the Company's garden in Cape Town, and oddly as land surveyor for the Government followed by the post of superintendent of roads, bridges and buildings. The mission lasted more than three months and reached as far east as the present-day town of Aberdeen, returning on 10 April 1689 with about a thousand head of cattle from trading with a Xhosa-Khoi tribe and quite amazingly having suffered no loss of life.

Early travelers were obliged to cross the Outeniqua Mountains near present-day Mossel Bay so as to avoid the near-impenetrable ravines and forests to the east. At that time the only way across the mountains was through Attaquas Kloof, named after a chief of the Hessequa Khoikhoi. This route was pioneered by Schrijver who, following an elephant track, traversed the kloof to the Olifants River in January 1689. The Duivenhoks River at Heidelberg was named by Schrijver, and "Schrijvershoek" near Langebaan lagoon was named after him.

He retired in 1699 to his farm Schoongezicht near Stellenbosch - the farm was substantially enlarged by the addition of surrounding property that had formed part of the deceased estates of freed slaves. Schoongezicht's history goes back to 1692 when Simon van der Stel, Governor of the Cape, granted 17 hectares of land to freed slaves Manuel and Antonia of Angola, Louis of Bengal and Isaac Schryver.

Schrijver married Marie Elizabeth van Coningshoven. Soon after, Schryver travelled north once again to search for copper. He returned after a few years and finally died on the farm, survived by Marie Elizabeth, who later married Jacob Groenewald. The farm remained in the family ownership for some 100 years. Schoongezicht passed through numerous hands in the three centuries of its existence. Coenraad Fick built the gabled Cape Dutch home about 1830. In the 1920s a Mrs. English bought the estate, restored the buildings, and improved the vineyards, renaming it Lanzerac after a wine-growing region in France. In 1958 the entrepreneur David Rawdon converted the estate into a successful hotel. In 1990 business tycoon Christo Wiese purchased the property, converting it into a winery and hotel.

Contemporary copies of Schrijver's journals of the expeditions have survived and are now kept in the Cape Archives.
