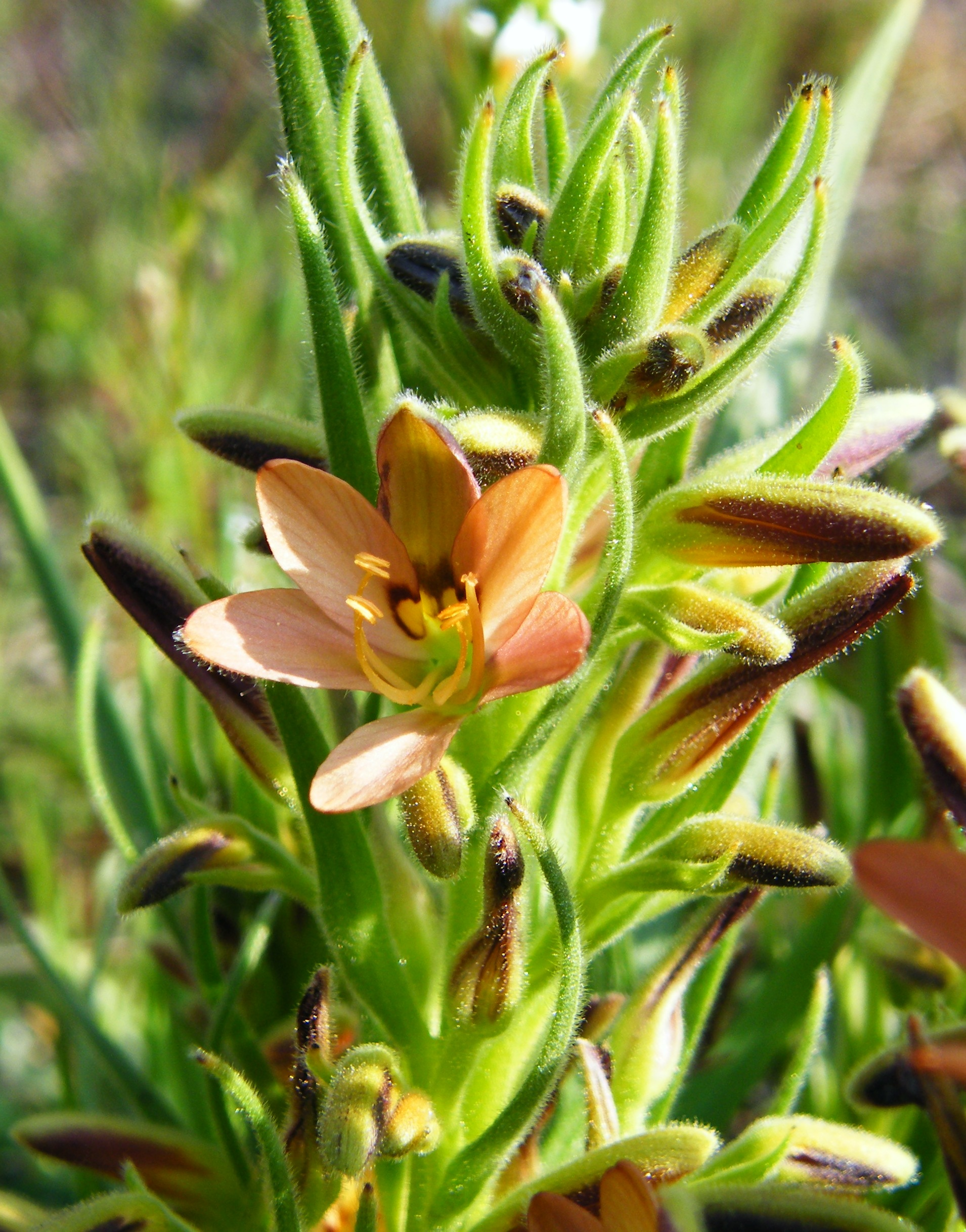

Conservation status
- Least Concern (SANBI Red List)

Scientific classification
- Kingdom: Plantae
- Clade: Tracheophytes
- Clade: Angiosperms
- Clade: Monocots
- Clade: Commelinids
- Order: Commelinales
- Family: Haemodoraceae
- Genus: Wachendorfia
- Species: W. multiflora

Binomial name
- Wachendorfia multiflora (Klatt) J.C.Manning & Goldblatt

Synonyms
- Wachendorfia parviflora W.F.Barker; Babiana multiflora Klatt

= Wachendorfia multiflora =

Plant endemic to the Western Cape

Wachendorfia multiflora is a species of herbaceous plant in the genus Wachendorfia. It is endemic to the Western Cape. It also known as the Kleinrooikanol in Afrikaans.

== Conservation status ==
Wachendorfia multiflora is classified as Least Concern.
