= Johannes Burman =

Dutch botanist (1707–1780)

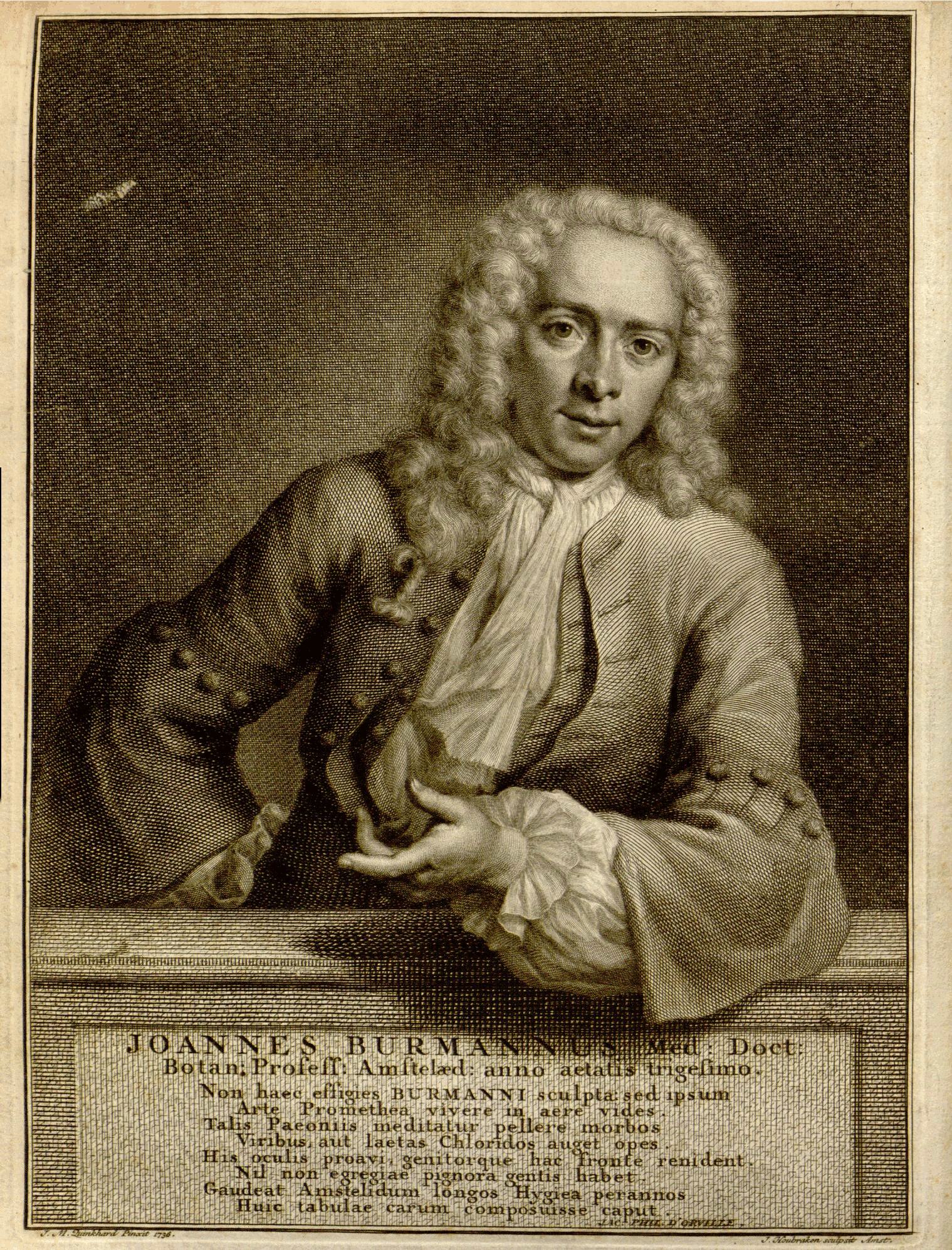
Engraved portrait of Johannes Burman, dated 1736, from the frontispiece to the 1737 first edition of his Thesaurus Zeylanicus

Johannes Burman (26 April 1707 in Amsterdam – 20 February 1780), was a Dutch botanist and physician. Burman specialized in plants from Ceylon, Amboina and Cape Colony. The name Pelargonium was introduced by Johannes Burman.

Johannes Burman was the eldest son of the theologian Frans Burman (1671–1719) and his wife Elizabeth Thierens. His brother was the theologian Frans Burman (1708–1793). He started his studies in Leiden in 1722 under Herman Boerhaave, and qualified in 1728 as a doctor of medicine, after which he practised in Amsterdam. After the death of Frederik Ruysch he was appointed Professor of Botany in Amsterdam. Johannes Burman was married to Adriana van Buuren. Their son Nicolaas Laurens Burman was also a botanist and studied under Linné in Uppsala.

Carl Linnaeus, in 1735 on a trip through Holland, was invited by Burman, carrying a letter of recommendation from Herman Boerhaave. Burman was impressed by his near-contemporary and offered him accommodation in his home on Keizersgracht. Linnaeus was employed by Burman for almost six weeks to complete a flora of the plants of Ceylon.

Burman introduced Linnaeus to George Clifford III and Clifford showed them a fantastic book. It was not in Burman's collections and Clifford said he could have it in exchange for Linnaeus who was employed to survey the gardens and the menagerie at Hartekamp. Burman was later commemorated by Linné in the genus Burmannia and family Burmanniaceae.

Burmann published his book with plants from the Cape Colony based on a collection by Nicolaes Witsen, the work of Caspar Commelin and Simon van der Stel. In his book on Amboinese plants, he used the work of Rumphius. For research and as illustrations on plants from the West Indies he used the work of the French botanist Charles Plumier.

The standard author abbreviation Burm. is used to indicate this individual as the author when citing a botanical name.

== Works ==
- Thesaurus zeylanicus, exhibens plantas in insula Zeylana nascentes (Amsterdam, 1737).
- Rariorum Africanarum plantarum (Amsterdam, deux parties, 1738–1739).
- Herbarium Amboinense, plurimas conplectens arbores, frutices, herbas, plantas terrestres & aquaticas, quae in Amboina, et adjacentibus reperiuntur insulis (6 volumes, Amsterdam, 1741–1750) – First posthumous edition of Het Amboinsche kruid-boek by Georg Eberhard Rumphius with Latin translation.
- Plantarum Americanarum fasciculus primus (Amsterdam, 1755–1760).
- Auctuarium (1755).
- Vacendorfia (1757).
- De ferrariae charactere (1757).
- Flora malabarici (1769).
