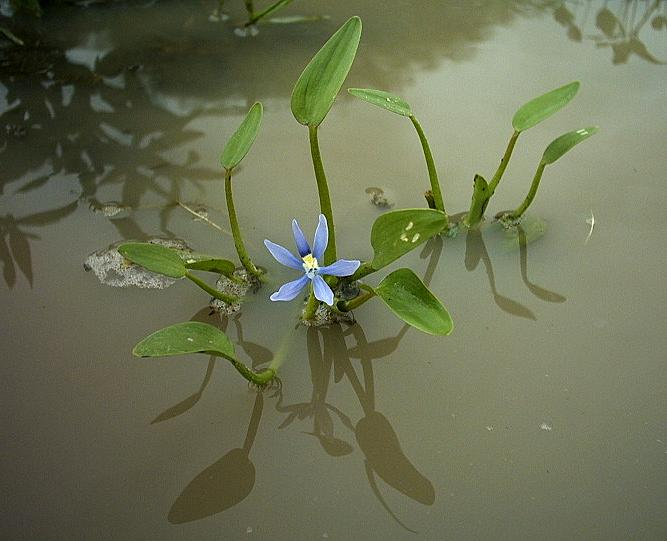

Scientific classification
- Kingdom: Plantae
- Clade: Tracheophytes
- Clade: Angiosperms
- Clade: Monocots
- Clade: Commelinids
- Order: Commelinales
- Family: Pontederiaceae
- Genus: Heteranthera
- Species: H. limosa

Binomial name
- Heteranthera limosa (Sw.) Willd.

Synonyms
- Heteranthera alismoides Humb. ex Link; Heteranthera limosa f. albiflora Benke; Heteranthera limosa f. limosa; Leptanthus ovalis Michx.; Lunania uniflora Raf.; Phrynium limosum (Sw.) Kuntze; Pontederia limosa Sw.; Pontederia triandra Banks ex Schult. & Schult.f.; Schollera limosa (Sw.) Kuntze; Schollera limosa (Sw.) Raf.; Triexastima uniflora (Raf.) Raf.

= Heteranthera limosa =

Species of water hyacinth

Heteranthera limosa is an annual flowering plant in the water hyacinth family known by the common names ducksalad and blue mudplantain. It grows in shallow water or on mud. It is considered a threatened species in parts of the central United States, and an invasive species weed in California, where it is a nuisance in rice paddies. It is also occasional in Florida waterways.

== Description ==
Heteranthera limosa is a polymorphic annual growing 2 to 6 inches tall. It looks different depending on the type of habitat it is growing in; plants in water look different than those growing on muddy ground. It is easily confused with other closely related species, so reliable identification is based on flowering plants. It has thick, spade-shaped green leaves with parallel veins. When plants are grown in water the leaves may be above or below the water surface, with submerged leaves linear in shape. The branching stems are creeping and maybe as long as 15 inches, rooting at the nodes. Its blue, purple, or white, perfect flowers, are six-merouse with narrow petals and three stamens. The nearly 1 inch wide flowers are subtended by a spathe. The flowering period is very brief subject to the correct environmental conditions, and can occur from May to November. The flowers open early in the morning and wither by noon.

== Distribution and habitat ==
Heteranthera limosa grows in shallow water with the best growth in water that is less than 5cm deep; it is also found immersed at pond edges and in roadside ditches. It is found growing in Arizona, Arkansas, California, Colorado, Florida, Illinois, Iowa, Kansas, Kentucky, Louisiana, Mississippi, Missouri, Nebraska, New Mexico, Oklahoma, South Dakota, Tennessee, Texas, Mexico, West Indies, Central America, and South America (Argentina, Bolivia, Brazil, Colombia, Ecuador, Paraguay, Venezuela).

In Minnesota this species is at the northern limit of its natural distribution where it is found in the southwestern corner of the state, it occurs in shallow vernal pools that form from water that seeps between rock layers that includes Sioux quartzite; it is found in association with other rare species in the state such as Isoetes melanopoda, Plantago elongata, and Cyperus acuminatus. In Minnesota it is listed as a threatened species, where it is rare and limited to specific unusual microhabitats.
