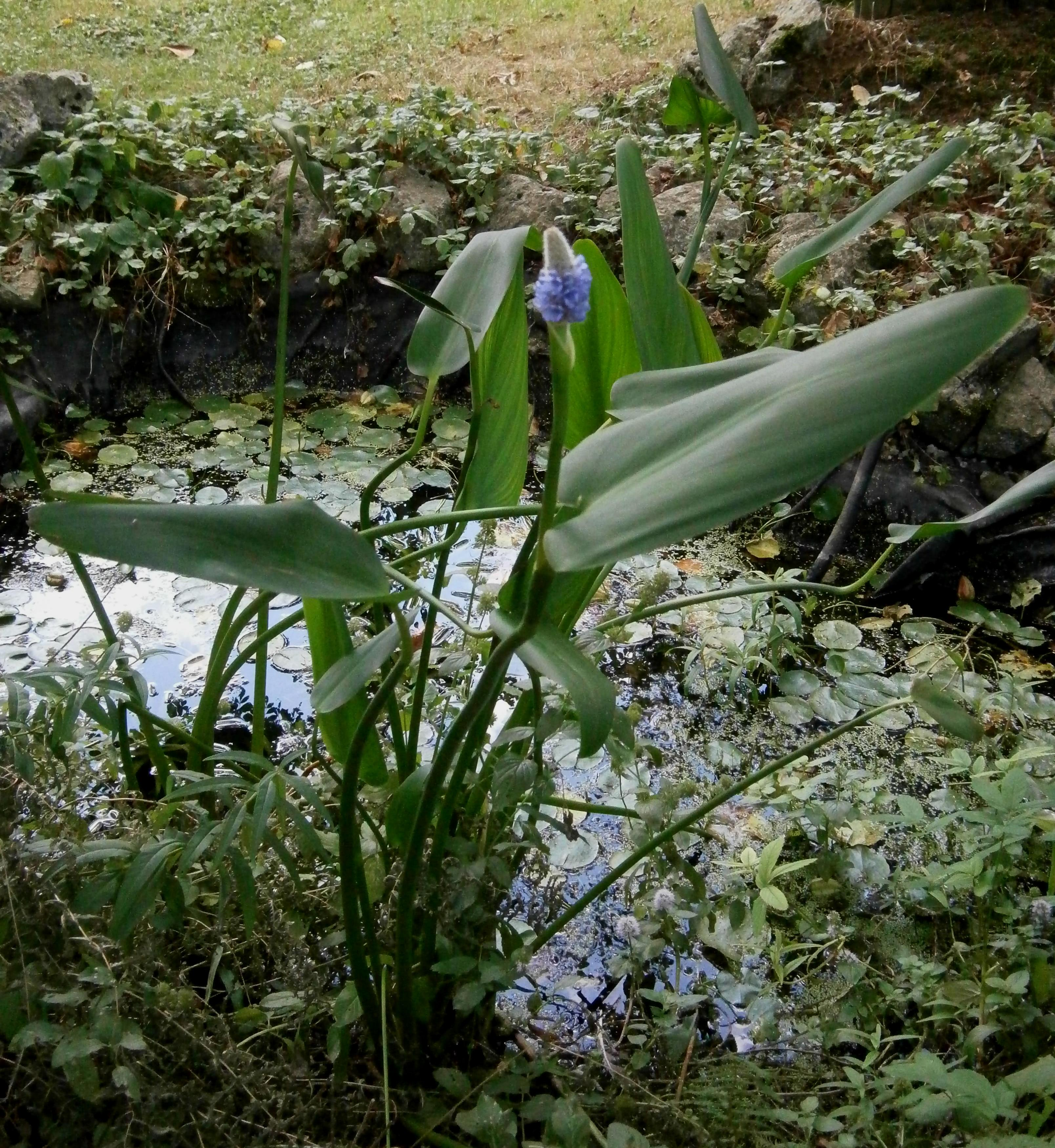

Scientific classification
- Kingdom: Plantae
- Clade: Embryophytes
- Clade: Tracheophytes
- Clade: Spermatophytes
- Clade: Angiosperms
- Clade: Monocots
- Clade: Commelinids
- Order: Commelinales
- Family: Pontederiaceae
- Genus: Pontederia
- Species: P. sagittata

Binomial name
- Pontederia sagittata C.Presl

Synonyms
- Pontederia cordata f. sagittata (C.Presl) Solms; Pontederia cordata var. sagittata (C.Presl) Schery

= Pontederia sagittata =

Species of aquatic plant

Pontederia sagittata is a species of aquatic plant belonging to the family Pontederiaceae.

== Description ==
It is a perennial plant with erect, rhizomatous tough stems. Basal leaves, emerging; pods 10–27 cm, the apex emarginate; petioles up to 1 m, not inflated, sometimes reddish; Blades 8-32 x 5–19 cm, lanceolate, the base cordate, the apex acute. Inflorescence with more than 50 flowers; flowers arranged in groups of 3, 4 or more along the peduncle, sessile; peduncle (6-)10-20(-22) cm, thick, hairy to hairy or rarely glabrous; internode between spathes (3.5-)5-16(-20) cm; blade of lower spathe 8-32 x 5–19 cm; upper spathe (3-)4-7(-9) cm, open on the upper 1/2, the apex mucronulate. 1.5 cm flowers. Perianth lilac or rarely white, externally hairy-glandular; outer lobes c. 6mm; internal lobes c. 6mm Long filaments 6–9 mm, with glandular hairs in the upper 1/3, short ones 0.7-3.5 mm, with glandular hairs in the upper 1/3; anthers of upper whorl 0.75–1 mm, yellow; anthers of lower whorl 0.55-0.85 mm, yellow. Pistil 3–6 mm; style hairy towards apex; stigma 3-lobed. Utricles 5–6 mm, deltiform, with smooth rib edges; seeds 2.3-2.5 mm, smooth, obovoid, covered by a mucilaginous layer with an oily appearance.

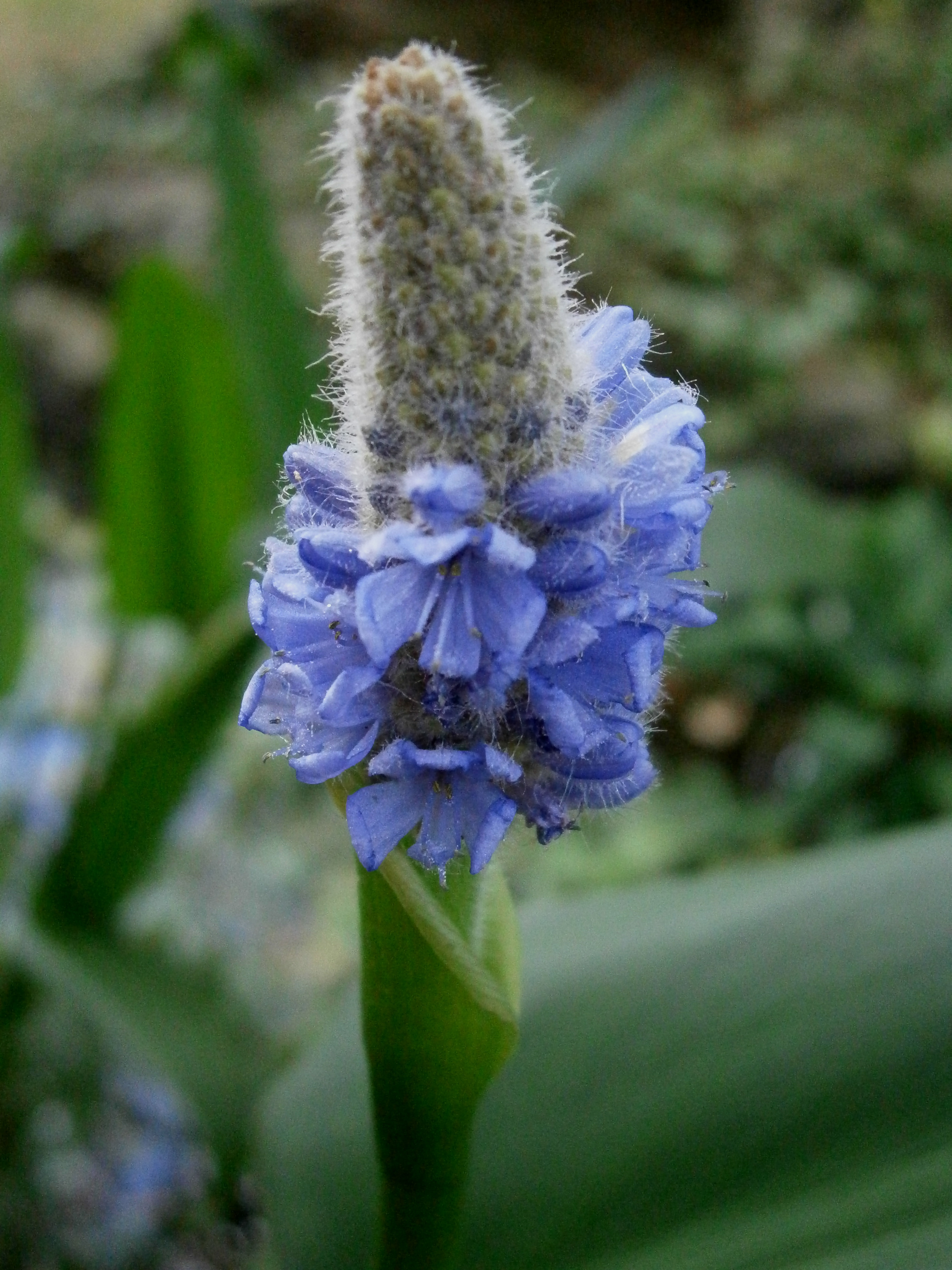
Inflorescence

== Taxonomy ==
Pontederia sagittata was first described by Carl Presl in 1827. It has sometimes been reduced to a form or variety of Pontederia cordata.

== Distribution and habitat ==
Pontederia sagittata has a discontinuous distribution, being native from Mexico to Central America and then eastern and southern Brazil. It is found on the edges of rivers, lagoons, ponds, and swamps, at altitudes of up to 1,500 m (4,900 ft).
