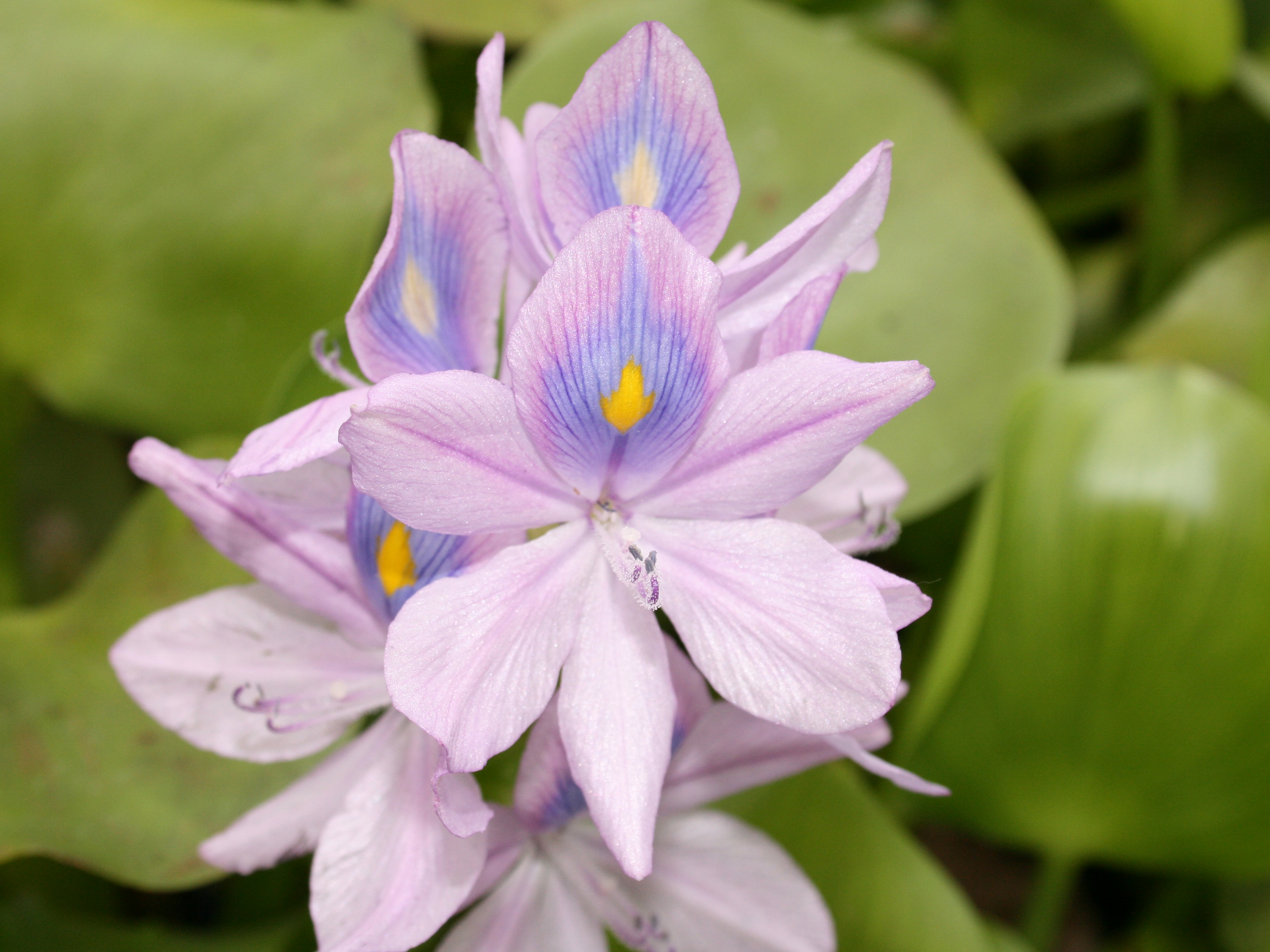
- Common water hyacinth (Pontederia crassipes)

Scientific classification
- Kingdom: Plantae
- Clade: Tracheophytes
- Clade: Angiosperms
- Clade: Monocots
- Clade: Commelinids
- Order: Commelinales
- Family: Pontederiaceae
- Genus: Eichhornia; Kunth

Species
- Four species (from Pellegrini et al. 2018): Eichhornia azurea - Anchored water hyacinth Eichhornia diversifolia - Variableleaf water hyacinth Eichhornia heterosperma Eichhornia natans

= Eichhornia =

Water hyacinth

Species of plant

Eichhornia, commonly called water hyacinths, was a polyphyletic genus of the aquatic flowering plants family Pontederiaceae. Since it was consistently recovered in three independent lineages, it has been sunk into Pontederia, together with Monochoria. Each of the three lineages is currently recognized as subgenera in Pontederia:

- Pontederia subg. Cabanisia, which includes P. meyeri, P. paniculata (the Brazilian water hyacinth), and P. paradoxa
- Pontederia subg. Oshunae, which includes the common water hyacinth, P. crassipes
- Pontederia subg. Eichhornia, which includes P. azurea, P. diversifolia, P. heterosperma, and P. natans

Pontederia subg. Eichhornia is pantropical, centered in South America but with P. natans being endemic to continental Africa and Madagascar. The other three species are restricted to the Neotropics.

It was named in honour of Friedrich Eichhorn, an early-19th-century Prussian minister of education.

== Description ==
Its species are perennial aquatic plants (or hydrophytes) with prostrate and densely branched stems. The inflorescences can have one to 30 conspicuously attractive flowers, mostly lavender to pink in colour, rarely white.
