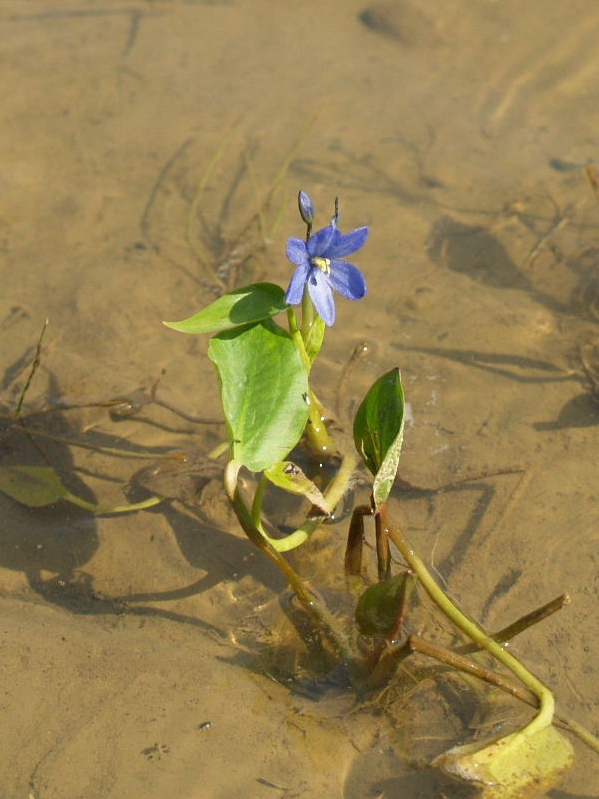

Scientific classification
- Kingdom: Plantae
- Clade: Tracheophytes
- Clade: Angiosperms
- Clade: Monocots
- Clade: Commelinids
- Order: Commelinales
- Family: Pontederiaceae
- Genus: Monochoria
- Species: M. korsakowii

Binomial name
- Monochoria korsakowii Regel & Maack, 1861

= Monochoria korsakowii =

Species of aquatic plant

Monochoria korsakowii is a species of annual flowering plant in the water hyacinth family known by several common names, including heartleaf false pickerelweed and oval-leafed pondweed. It is found in lakes, ponds, swamps, and rice paddy fields.

It is native to east Asia, although it is endangered in Japan due to excessive use of acetolactate synthase-inhibiting herbicides. In China, it has become a significant threat to rice production, particularly in Liaoning province, where it has evolved high levels of resistance to the herbicide bensulfuron-methyl.
