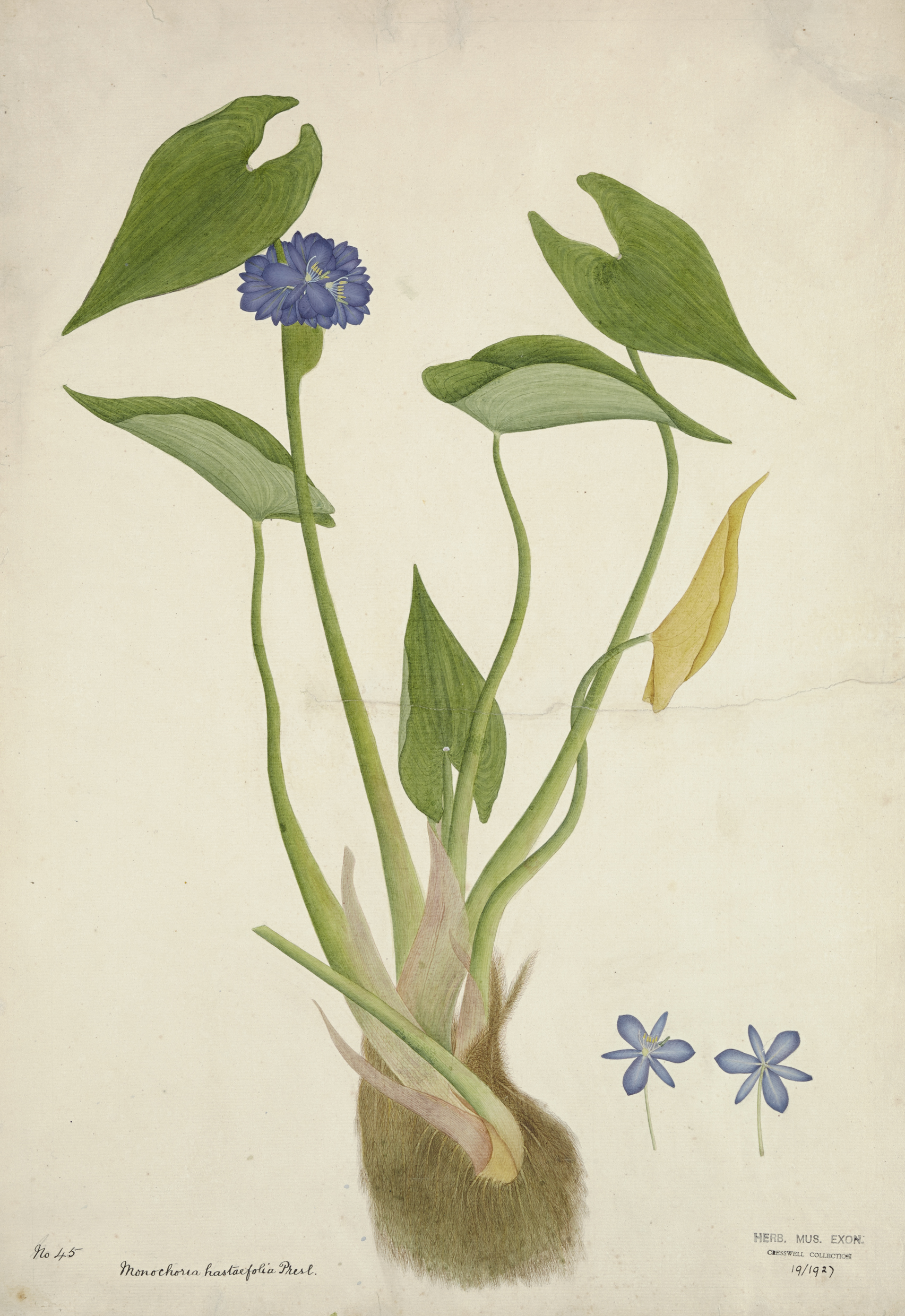

Scientific classification
- Kingdom: Plantae
- Clade: Tracheophytes
- Clade: Angiosperms
- Clade: Monocots
- Clade: Commelinids
- Order: Commelinales
- Family: Pontederiaceae
- Genus: Pontederia
- Species: P. hastata

Binomial name
- Pontederia hastata L.

Synonyms
- Calcarunia hastata (L.) Raf., not validly publ.; Carigola hastata (L.) Raf.; Monochoria chinensis Gand.; Monochoria dilatata (Banks) Kunth; Monochoria hastata (L.) Solms; Monochoria hastifolia C.Presl; Monochoria sagittata Kunth; Pontederia dilatata Banks; Pontederia sagittata Roxb., nom. illeg.; Pontederia sagittifolia B.Heyne ex Wall., nom. nud.; Pontederia vaginalis Blanco, nom. illeg.

= Pontederia hastata =

Species of plant

Pontederia hastata is a species of flowering plant in the family Pontederiaceae, native from tropical and subtropical Asia south to the Northern Territory of Australia. It was first described by Carl Linnaeus in 1753.

== Distribution ==
Pontederia hastata is native to south-central and southeastern mainland China, Hainan, tropical Asia, and the Northern Territory of Australia.
