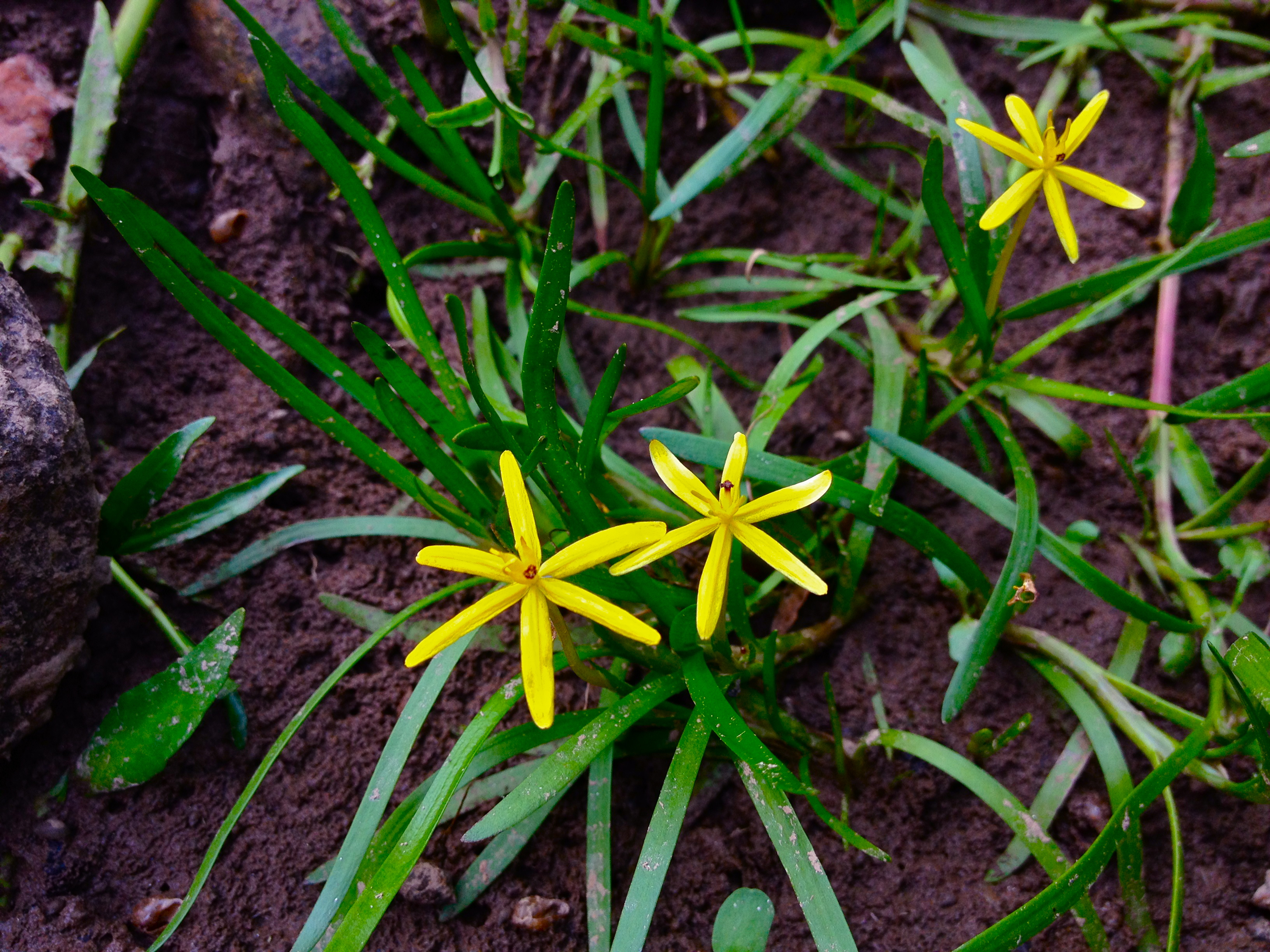

Scientific classification
- Kingdom: Plantae
- Clade: Tracheophytes
- Clade: Angiosperms
- Clade: Monocots
- Clade: Commelinids
- Order: Commelinales
- Family: Pontederiaceae
- Genus: Heteranthera
- Species: H. dubia

Binomial name
- Heteranthera dubia (Jacq.) MacMill.

Synonyms
- Heteranthera graminea Heteranthera liebmannii Zosterella dubia Zosterella longituba

= Heteranthera dubia =

Species of aquatic plant

Heteranthera dubia, commonly called water stargrass or grassleaf mudplantain, is a species of aquatic plant in the pickerel-weed family (Pontederiaceae). It is native to North and Central America where it is widespread from Canada to Guatemala.

It lives submerged in freshwater such as rivers and lakes. It can be found as deep as 5.5 meters, to as shallow as stranded on the shoreline. It is most abundant in alkaline waters.

Heteranthera dubia is a perennial with much variation in its appearance. The leaves are different sizes and shapes across individuals, partly genetic variation and partly response to water conditions, for example, the speed and turbulence of surrounding currents. Submersed individuals also have a different stem and leaf morphology from those that occur partially or completely out of the water. Its inflorescence bears a single short-lived flower that blooms in the morning and wilts in the evening. It has six yellow perianth parts each less than a centimeter long spreading from a tubular throat one to seven centimeters long. There are three long, thick yellow stamens with curling anthers and one yellow style. The fruit is a capsule containing many winged seeds.

The plant sometimes has galls in its tissue, which are caused by the parasitic fungus Membranosorus heterantherae.
