= Aquatic plant management =

Aquatic plant management involves the science and methodologies used to control invasive and non-invasive aquatic plant species in waterways. Methods used include spraying herbicide, biological controls, mechanical removal as well as habitat modification. Preventing the introduction of invasive species is ideal.

Aquaculture has been a source of exotic and ultimately invasive species introductions such Oreochromis niloticus. Aquatic plants released from home fish tanks have also been an issue.

== Impact ==
Aquatic weeds are obviously most economically problematic where humans and water touch each other. Water weeds reduce our capacity for hydroelectric generation, drinking water supply, industrial water supply, agricultural water supply, and recreational use of water bodies including recreational boating. Some weeds do this by increasing - rather than decreasing - the evaporation loss at the surface. Particular weeds and aquatic insects have a special relationship which makes the plants a source of insect pests.

== Organizations ==
In Florida the Florida Fish and Wildlife Conservation Commission (FWC) has an aquatic plant management section. The State of Washington has an Aquatic Plant Management Program.

The Aquatic Plant Management Society is an organization in the U.S. and published the Journal of Aquatic Plant Management.

The City of Winter Park, Florida has a herbicide program.

== Species ==
Invasive aquatic species include:

- Eichhornia crassipes (water hyacinth), invasive outside its native habitat in the Amazon Basin
- Hydrilla, invasive in North America
- Limnobium laevigatum, invasive in the U.S.
- Myriophyllum spicatum, invasive in North America
- Myriophyllum verticillatum, invasive in North America
- Monochoria vaginalis, invasive outside its native habitat in Asia and the Pacific
- Pistia
- Salvinia molesta

== Aquatic plant harvesting methods ==
Harvesting methods

Harvesting refers to anthropogenic removal of aquatic plants from their environment. Aquatic plant harvesting is often done to clear waters for navigation and recreation, as well as for the purpose of ridding the environment of invasive plant species. However, this aquatic plant management style can also have negative effects on the environment such as harming non-target plants and animals, increasing turbidity, and potentially spreading invasive plants via fragmentation. There are multiple plant removal methods available depending on the purpose of removal, the habitat of the plant, the animals surrounding the plants, as well as the density, access point, and species of the plant. Plant removal methods consist of: pulling by hand, mechanical cutting, cut and grinding, suction harvesting, rototilling, and hydro-raking.

Mechanical cutting is the most common method of aquatic plant harvesting. This is an efficient method that can cover a large area. Removing large amounts of plants from the water can have a positive impact on the daily oxygen levels in shallow aquatic environments. Mechanical cutting has short term effect, which makes it a good method to use with the purpose of harvesting nutrients and promoting regrowth of the plants. However, the equipment used for cutting is expensive, and this method is also nonselective, often damaging non-target plants, habitats, and animals. This method of harvesting has a tendency to remove large portions of macroinvertebrate, semi-aquatic vertebrate, and fish populations. Cutting also allows the possibility of further spreading plants that reproduce via fragmentation. Mechanical cutting is commonly used in heavily infested areas because of its speed and efficiency, however this leaves behind large amounts of dead plants free floating in the environment. Leaving large mats of cut plants in the water can have negative effects on the aquatic environment by providing obstacles for animals, reducing of sunlight for remaining plants, creating build up on shore lines, and poor water quality. Cutting is often performed using harvesters with a sickle-bar cutting blade on the back. Mechanical cutting is often paired with harvesting boats to collect the dead plants, or have a conveyor belt to load cut plants onto the boat.

The cut and grind method is a highly efficient method of harvesting with the disposal of dead plants included. This method also mechanically cuts large amounts of plants at a time then proceeds to grind the plants to dispose back into the lake. This method is best for bodies of water with chronic invasive plant problems in which plant disposal must be considered. Grinding plants minimizes the need for any extra boats or disposal methods to manage the cut plants. However, this method contains the same downfalls of mechanical cutting. It is a nonselective, short term solution that can resuspend sediment. Although different from standard cutting, the grinding of the plants still leaves large masses of plant material in the water creating negative effects in the remaining environment.

The Rotovating method uses rotating blades to uproot plants from the sediment. Rotovating is more likely to remove the entire plant, including the roots, with an intermediate-term effect on regrowth. This method is effective but requires expensive equipment and has negative effects on the environment. Rotovating is nonselective, and it may spread plants via fragmentation and suspend excess amounts of sediment. Rotovating is an efficient process but requires a separate disposal method.

Hydro-raking works similarly to rotovating. A backhoe is used to target the roots and rip the plant out of the sediment, followed by a rake to remove the vegetation. This method works best for thick, difficult plants to remove, and is effective for long-term removal since roots are removed. Hydro-rakings holds the same challenges as rotovating, with the potential to indirectly spread species, damage more plants than necessary, and create turbidity by suspending sediment.

Pulling by hand or suction harvesting are diver/snorkeler operated, highly selective methods of removing aquatic plants. Individuals manually pull or vacuum suck the entire plant from the sediment. Vacuum suction removes the entire plant (stem, leaves, roots) including the surrounding sediment from the floor of the aquatic environment. This provides a long-term effect with minimal regrowth of the plants. Manual removal is a slow, inefficient process that is often only performed on small vegetative communities in underdeveloped areas. Suction harvesting requires more technology and is more expensive. Pulling by hand is more cost effective; however, pulling by hand runs the risk of suspending excess sediment, suction harvesting does not have this risk.

== See also ==
- Aquatic ecosystem
- GIS and aquatic science
