= H. gardneri =

H. gardneri may refer to:

- Hydrothrix gardneri, an aquatic plant species found in Brazil
- Hypoxis gardneri, a species in the genus Hypoxis

== See also ==
- Gardneri
