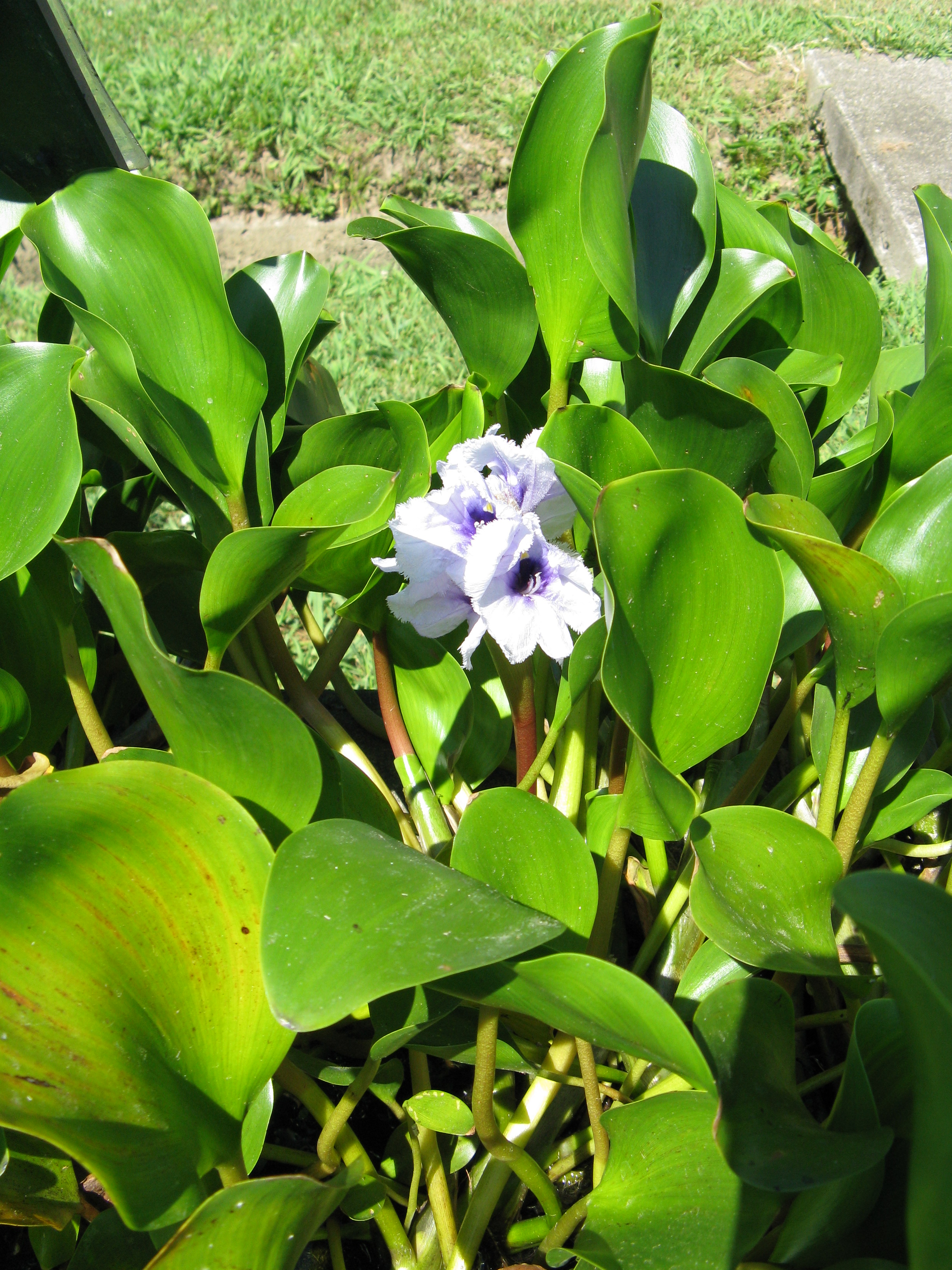
- E. azurea flowering

Scientific classification
- Kingdom: Plantae
- Clade: Embryophytes
- Clade: Tracheophytes
- Clade: Spermatophytes
- Clade: Angiosperms
- Clade: Monocots
- Clade: Commelinids
- Order: Commelinales
- Family: Pontederiaceae
- Genus: Pontederia
- Species: P. azurea

Binomial name
- Pontederia azurea Sw.

= Pontederia azurea =

Anchored water hyacinth

Species of aquatic plant

Pontederia azurea is a water hyacinth from the Americas, sometimes known as anchored water hyacinth. It is the type species of Pontederia subg. Eichhornia, which was previously recognized as part of the polyphyletic genus Eichhornia. It is of some interest as an aquarium plant.

== Description ==
The anchored water hyacinth is a free-floating aquatic perennial plant. It is known by various common names such as, water orchid, and floating water hyacinth. The water hyacinth could be identified by its distinct thick, waxy green leaves that has a rounded or elliptical shape. It is able to grow under water and above water due to its long stem that is able to produce up to 5 flowers on a single stem. The hyacinth produces large blossoms with lavender blue petals and a yellow blotch at the center, the flower bearing great resembles with that of a lilac. The petals of the flower are normally 2 inches wide with six petals making up the flower. It can grow up to three feet above water surface and is rooted in the soil underwater.

== Distribution ==
The Anchored Water Hyacinth (Eichhornia azurea) is native to Central and South America, inhabiting warm bodies of water. In 1884, the species was introduced to New Orleans from South America.

The species has expanded to Alabama, Arkansas, California, Florida, Georgia, Hawaii, Indiana, Kentucky, Missouri, Mississippi, North Carolina, South Carolina, Texas, Virginia, and Vermont. E. azurea also has been introduced into Japan, China, Singapore, and New Zealand. The E. azurea species is considered to be a noxious species by the United States and is prohibited in the following states: Alabama, Arizona, California, Florida, Massachusetts, North Carolina, Oregon, South Carolina, Texas, and Vermont.

In 1884, the anchored water hyacinth was introduced from South America to the United States as an ornamental. The species is able to grow rapidly once introduced and rapidly forms expansive mats of the water hyacinths. Hyacinths are known to double its population size in just two weeks and can reproduce through their seeds and horizontal stems. When they wither, their stems bend and they are able to release their seeds into the soil below. Fragmenting a piece of the plant allows for the plant to be transported and planted elsewhere.

== Invasive Species ==
P. azurea poses a threat as a noxious weed. Due to its enlarged bulb-like petioles, the plant is able to not only grow under the surface of the water, but also is able to float and extend above water. In competition with other species for similar requirements in water surface area or bank rooting positions, P. azurea is extremely successful. As an invasive species, the P. azurea is able to accumulate on the surface of water that smothers native species while also lowering light penetration and dissolved oxygen levels. This contributes to the decline of biodiversity as aquatic animals suffocate and die with the lack of dissolved oxygen and resources. Water quality also suffers as result of the lack of dissolved oxygen in the water. This also impacts the fauna that rely on the diverse native species that die against the P. azurea. It also poses a threat towards native aquatic animals as P. azurea is able to reduce their food and habitats. Additionally, the P. azurea is a good habitat for disease vectors such as mosquitoes and parasitic flatworms which bring about diseases such as malaria and schistosomiasis.

The anchored water hyacinths also contributes to water loss through transpiration and also negatively affects recreational activities as it clogs waterways. The clogging of water ways prevents swimming, boating and fishing.

== Control ==
Pontederia azurea is similar to Pontederia crassipes; the most obvious difference is that P. crassipes is a free floating plant. Both are considered invasive weeds, but P. crassipes is the more widely known and studied as an invasive species; control methods for P. crassipes are generally suitable for P. azurea as well. Three types of controls are variously appropriate: biological, physical, and chemical. Biological and physical control require consistent management to have any consistent effect, and chemical control also demands competent management to yield significant benefit while avoiding environmental harm.

=== Chemical Control ===
Chemical control consists of herbicides and the one applied to water hyacinths are 2,4-D, Diquat and Glysophate which requires skilled operators. They have the disadvantage that leaving the dead plants on the water increases degree of anoxia and eutrophication.

=== Physical Control ===
Physical control is suited for large infestations only when large-scale mechanical aids are available for physically removing the weeds, but it is necessary in early stages of control of intense infestations that are already smothering large water surfaces, rendering the water anoxic. There are many ways of harvesting the weeds and composting them to die, but they all demand that the plant material be removed from the water to avoid eutrophication.

=== Biological Control ===
The last type of control, biological, is favored whenever practical. This control consists of the use of natural enemies, insects in particular.
