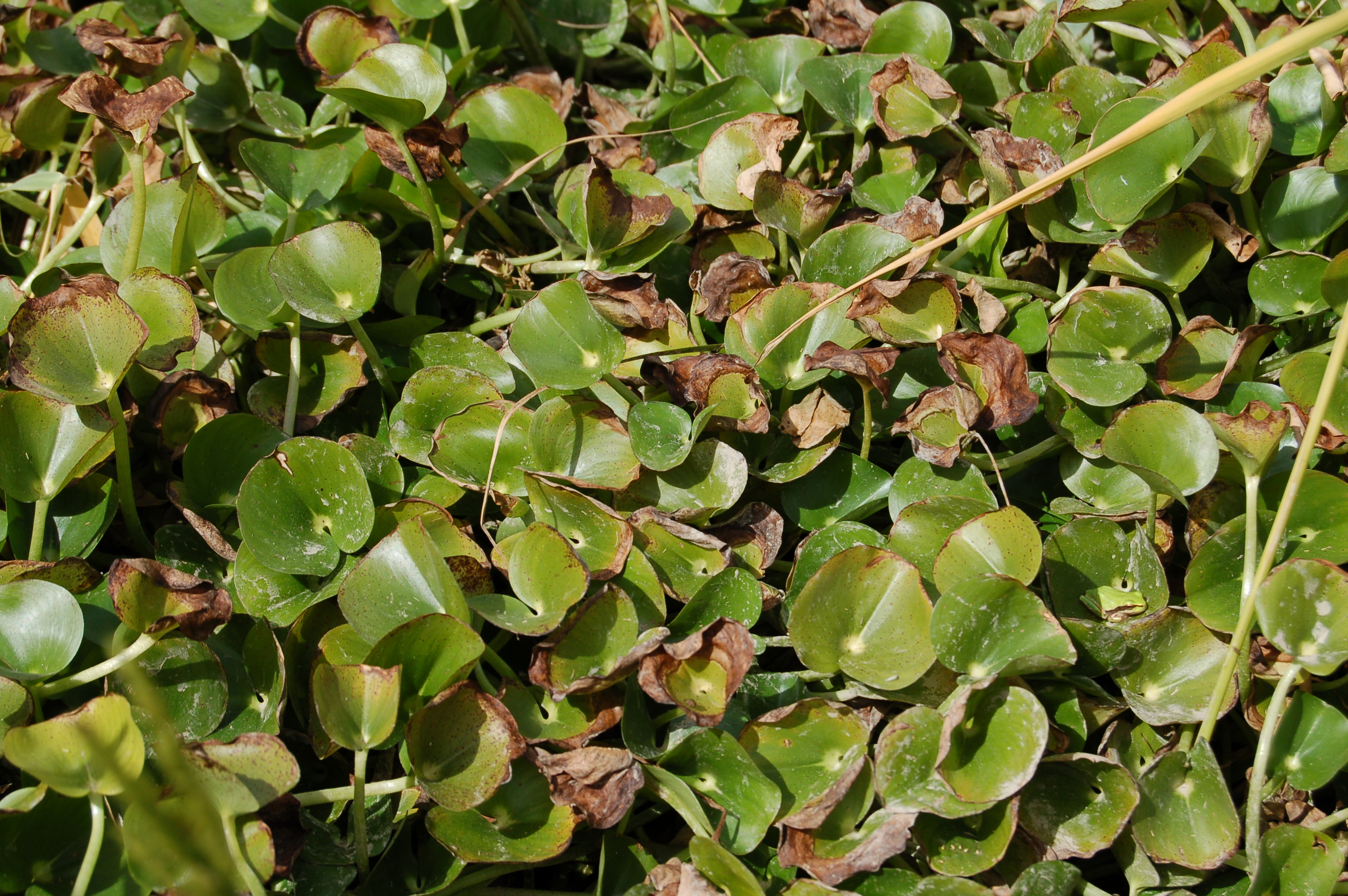

Scientific classification
- Kingdom: Plantae
- Clade: Tracheophytes
- Clade: Angiosperms
- Clade: Monocots
- Clade: Commelinids
- Order: Commelinales
- Family: Pontederiaceae
- Genus: Heteranthera
- Species: H. reniformis

Binomial name
- Heteranthera reniformis Ruiz & Pav.

Synonyms
- Heterandra reniformis (Ruiz & Pav.) P.Beauv.; Leptanthus reniformis (Ruiz & Pav.) Michx.; Phrynium reniforme (Ruiz & Pav.) Kuntze; Schollera reniformis (Ruiz & Pav.) Kuntze; Buchosia aquatica Vell.; Heteranthera acuta Willd.; Heteranthera pubescens Vahl; Heteranthera reniformis var. conjungens O.Schwarz; Heteranthera virginicus Steud.; Leptanthus peruvianus Pers.; Leptanthus virginicus Pers.; Phrynium reniforme var. acutum (Willd.) Kuntze; Pontederia azurea Schult. & Schult.f.

= Heteranthera reniformis =

Species of plant

Heteranthera reniformis common name kidneyleaf mud-plantain, and mud plantain; is a species of flowering plant in the family Pontederiaceae. It is found in North America. It is listed as a special concern and believed extirpated in Connecticut. It listed as endangered in Illinois and Ohio.

== Native American ethnobotany ==
The Cherokee apply a hot poultice of the root to inflamed wounds and sores.
