= Hydrothrix =

Scientific classification
- Kingdom: Plantae
- Clade: Tracheophytes
- Clade: Angiosperms
- Clade: Monocots
- Clade: Commelinids
- Order: Commelinales
- Family: Pontederiaceae
- Genus: Heteranthera
- Species: H. gardneri

Binomial name
- Heteranthera gardneri (Hook.f.) M.Pell.

Synonyms
- Hydrothrix gardneri Hook.f.; Hydrothrix verticillaris Hook.f.; Hookerina gardneri Kuntze, Rev. Gen. 2: 718. 1891

Genus of flowering plants

Hydrothrix Hook.f. was previously a monotypic flowering plant genus of Pontederiaceae, but is currently included in a broader and monophyletic Heteranthera.

The highly modified Heteranthera gardneri is a submerged aquatic with a two-flowered pseudanthium found in eastern Brazil. It is used as an aquarium plant.
