= Pseudanthium =

Type of inflorescence, clusters of flowers

A pseudanthium (Ancient Greek for 'false flower'; pl.: pseudanthia) is an inflorescence that resembles a flower. The word is sometimes used for other structures that are neither a true flower nor a true inflorescence. Examples of pseudanthia include flower heads, composite flowers, or capitula, which are special types of inflorescences in which anything from a small cluster to hundreds or sometimes thousands of flowers are grouped together to form a single flower-like structure. Pseudanthia take various forms. The real flowers (the florets) are generally small and often greatly reduced, but the pseudanthium itself can sometimes be quite large (as in the heads of some varieties of sunflower).

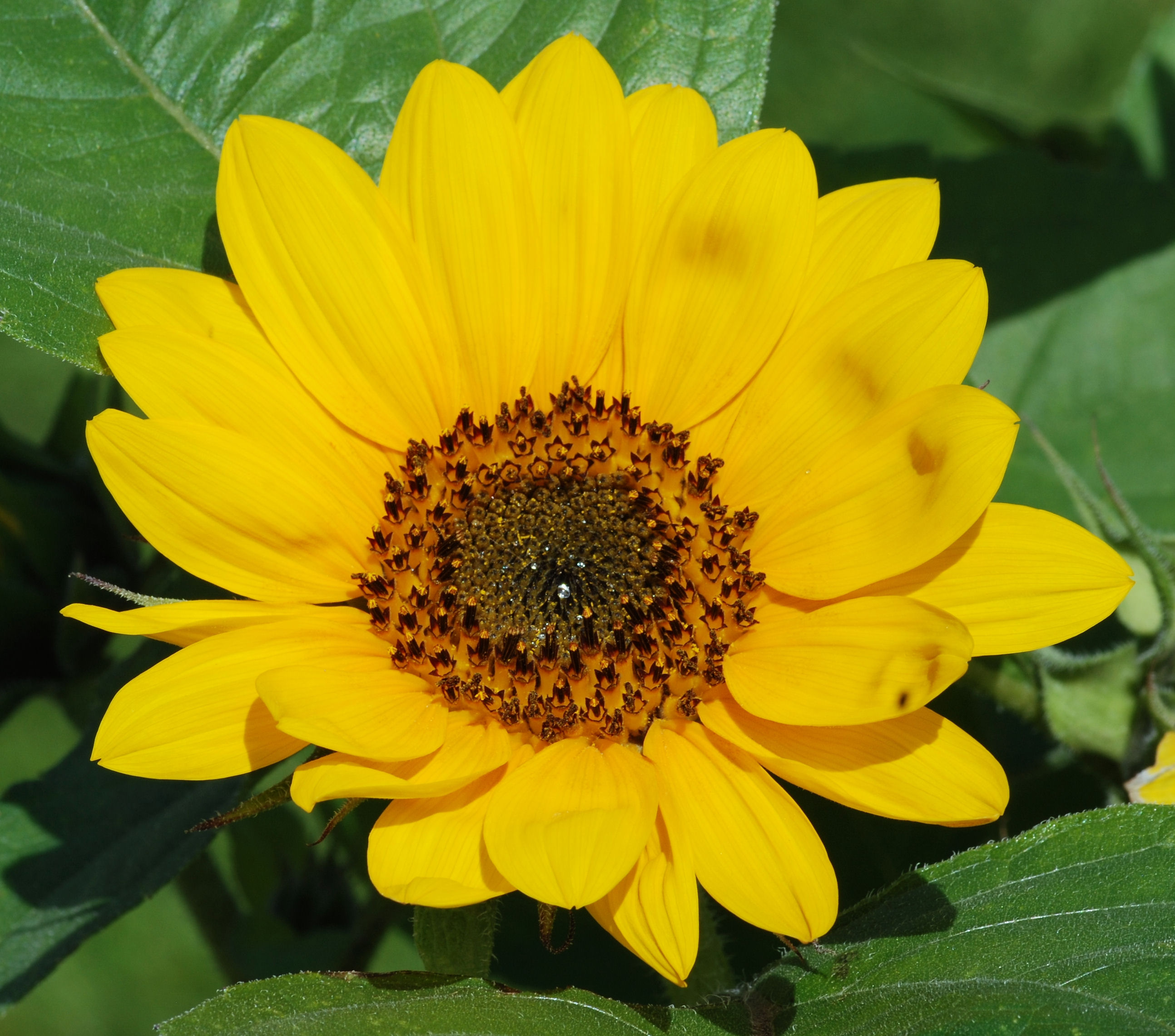
What appear to be "petals" of an individual flower, are actually each individual complete ray flowers, and at the center is a dense pack of individual tiny disc flowers. Because the collection has the overall appearance of a single flower, the collection of flowers in the head of this sunflower is called a pseudanthium or a composite

Pseudanthia are characteristic of the daisy and sunflower family (Asteraceae), whose flowers are differentiated into ray flowers and disk flowers, unique to this family. The disk flowers in the center of the pseudanthium are actinomorphic and the corolla is fused into a tube. Flowers on the periphery are zygomorphic and the corolla has one large lobe (the so-called "petals" of a daisy are individual ray flowers, for example). Either ray or disk flowers may be absent in some plants: Senecio vulgaris lacks ray flowers and Taraxacum officinale lacks disk flowers. The individual flowers of a pseudanthium in the family Asteraceae (or Compositae) are commonly called florets. The pseudanthium has a whorl of bracts below the flowers, forming an involucre.

In all cases, a pseudanthium is superficially indistinguishable from a flower, but closer inspection of its anatomy will reveal that it is composed of multiple flowers. Thus, the pseudanthium represents an evolutionary convergence of the inflorescence to a reduced reproductive unit that may function in pollination like a single flower, at least in plants that are animal pollinated.

Pseudanthia may be grouped into types. The first type has units of individual flowers that are recognizable as single flowers even if fused. In the second type, the flowers do not appear as individual units and certain organs like stamens and carpels cannot be associated with any individual flowers.

== History ==
The term pseudanthium was originally applied to flowers with stamens in two whorls with the outer whorl opposite the petals (obdiplostemonate) or polyandric flowers; by the early 1900s the term was repurposed by the advocates of the 'pseudanthium theory' which assumed flower evolution originated from a polyaxial instead of a monoaxial configuration.

== Related terms ==
=== Synorganization ===
The collection of independent organs into a complex structure is called synorganization.

=== Head ===
Head is an equivalent term for flower head and pseudanthium when used in the botanical sense.

=== Capitulum ===
Capitulum (plural capitula) can be used as an exact synonym for pseudanthium and flower head; however, this use is generally but not always restricted to the family Asteraceae. At least one source defines it as a small flower head. In addition to its botanical use as a term meaning flower head it is also used to mean the top of the sphagnum plant.

=== Calathid ===
Calathid (plural calathids or calathidia) is a very rarely used term. It was defined in the 1966 book The genera of flowering plants (Angiospermae) as a specific term for a flower head of a plant in the family Asteraceae. However, on-line botanical glossaries do not define it, and Google Scholar does not link to any significant usage of the term in a botanical sense.

== Plant families ==
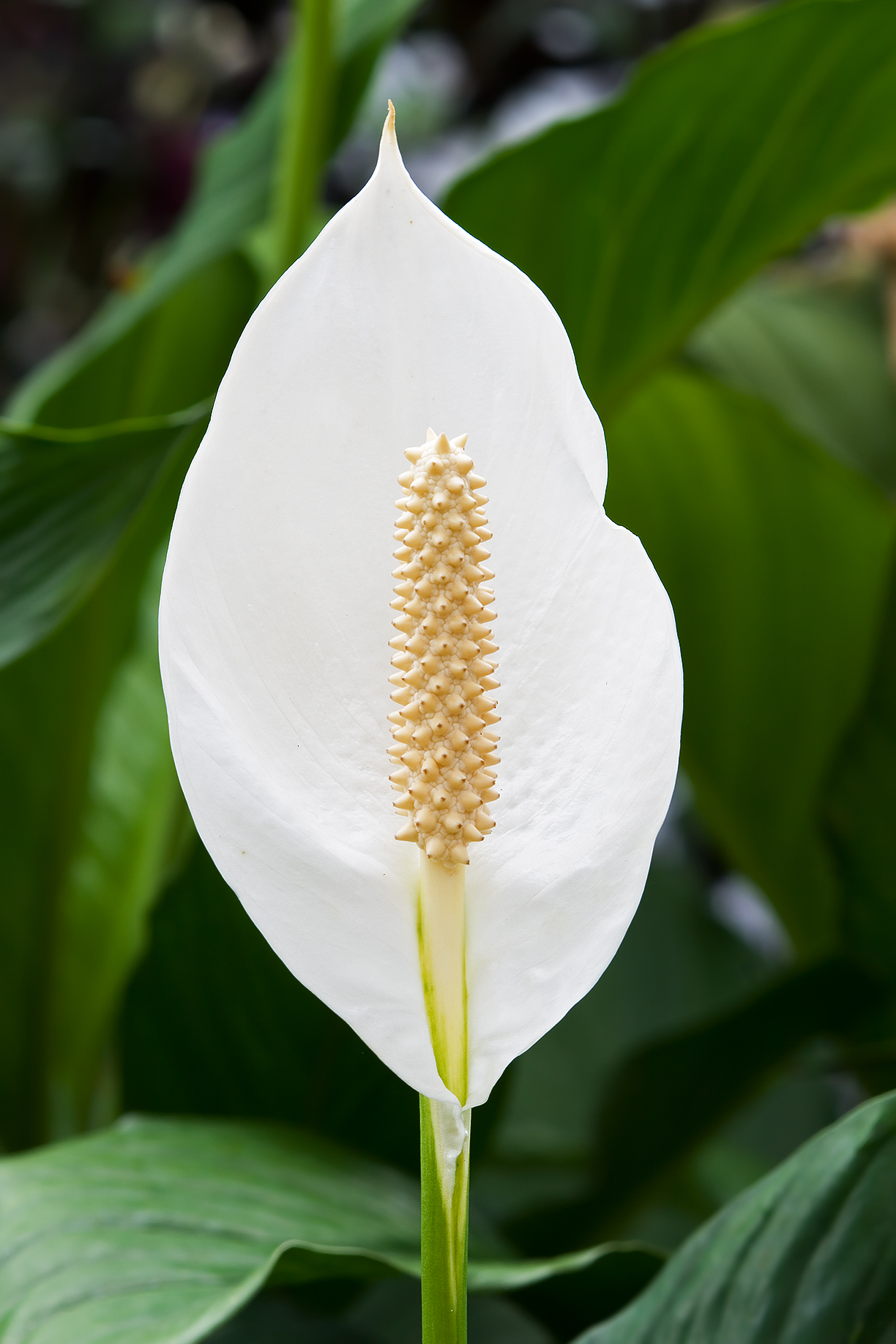
Peace lily (Spathiphyllum cochlearispathum) pseudanthium

Pseudanthia occur in 40 plant families including:

- Adoxaceae — in some Viburnum spp.
- Apiaceae — pseudanthia are called umbels
- Araceae — pseudanthia are called spadices
- Asteraceae — The capitula (singular capitulum) or flower heads, which are collections of different types of flowers, is a pseudanthium. The individual flowers of a capitulum are called florets. Commonly the capitulum has ray flowers specialized to attract pollinators arranged surrounding disc flowers responsible for sexual reproduction, perianth symmetry can be variable within the family.
- Campanulaceae
- Centrolepidaceae — Where individual male and female flowers are grouped together and wrapped in bracts forming a pseudanthium appearing as a bisexual flower.
- Cornaceae

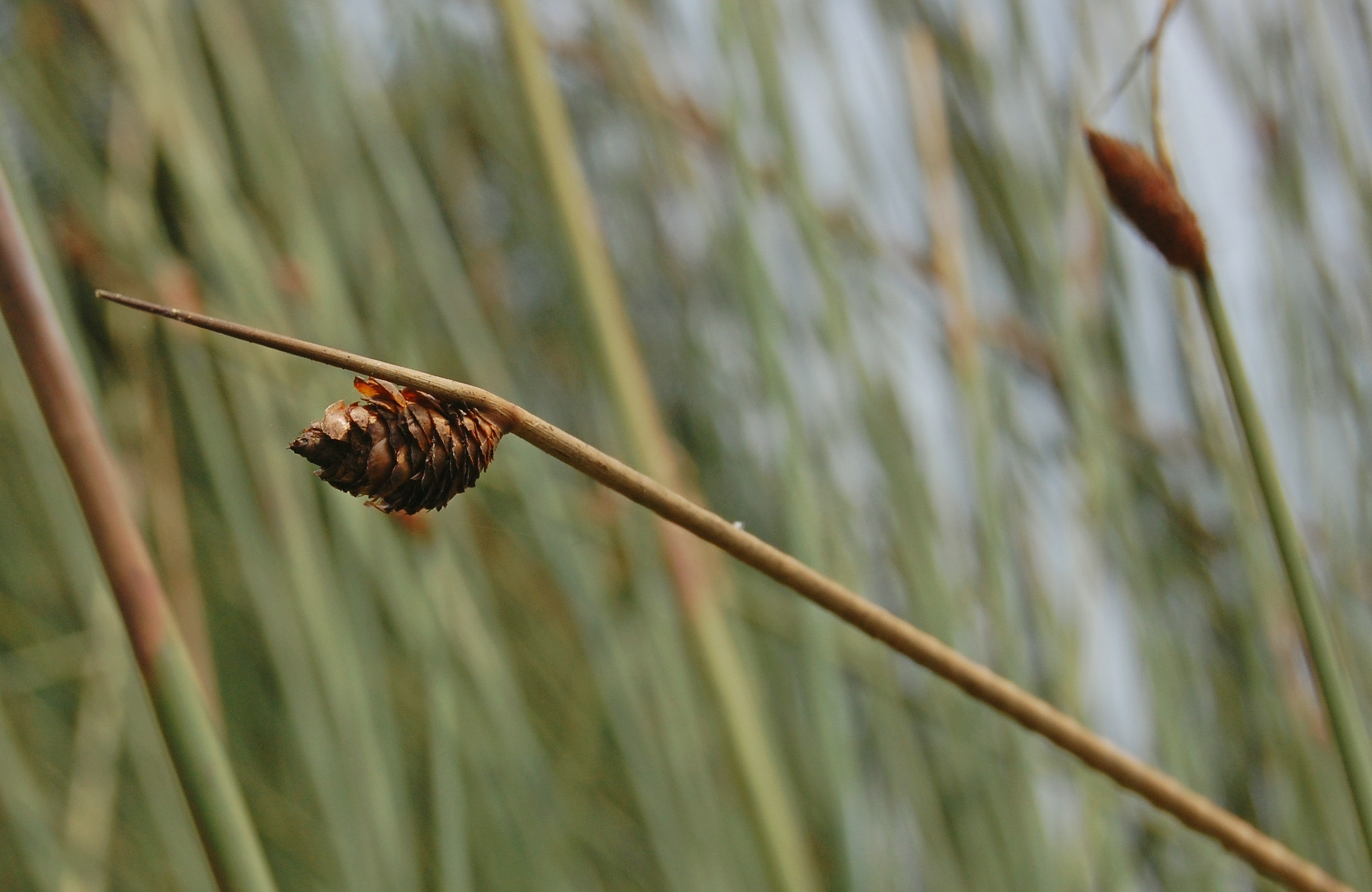
Compressed pseudanthia of Lepironia articulata

- Cyperaceae — In subfamily Mapanioideae, pseudanthia are termed spicoids. In Lepironia sp the pseudanthium is greatly condensed with staminate flowers surrounding a central terminal pistillate female flower.
- Dipsacaceae
- Euphorbiaceae — in Euphorbia — pseudanthia are called cyathia, composed of a single carpal flower with few to many single-stamen staminate flowers contained within a cup-shaped structure or bracts; the bracts are often rimmed with nectaries and less commonly petal-like structures. The central cyathia may be composed of all male flowers.

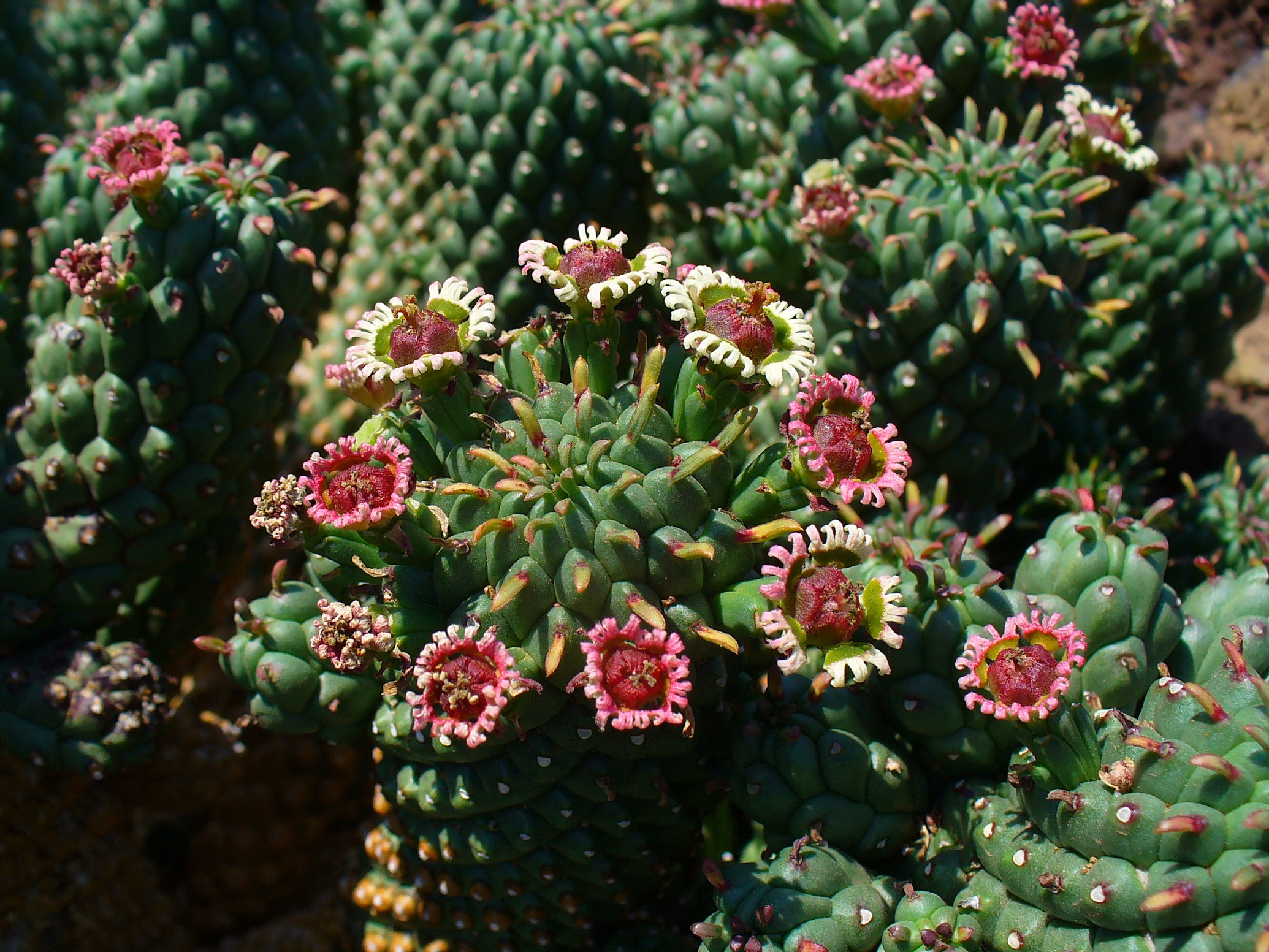
Euphorbia caput-medusae 01

- Eriocaulaceae
- Hamamelidaceae — in Rhodoleia
- Marcgraviaceae
- Moraceae

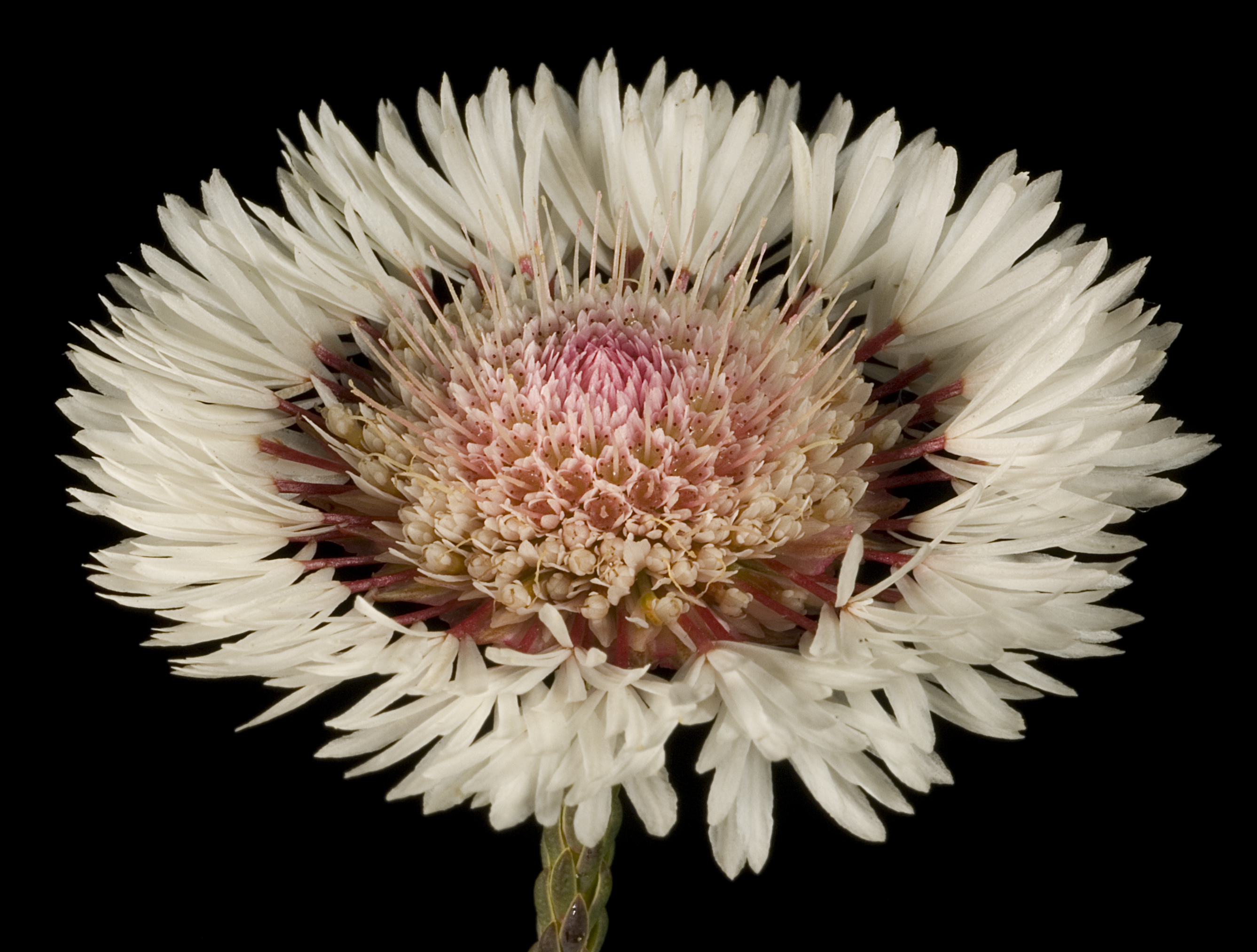
Actinodium cunninghamii pseudanthia

- Myrtaceae — in Actinodium — the pseudanthia is a head-like structure with fertile flowers in the center and showy ray-like structures along the outside.
- Nothofagaceae — in subgenus Lophozonia — a three‐flowered dichasium without branches.
- Nyssaceae — in Davidia
- Poaceae
- Pontederiaceae — in Hydrothrix
- Proteaceae
- Rubiaceae
- Saururaceae — in Anemopsis

In some families, it is not yet clear whether the "flower" represents a pseudanthium because the anatomical work has not been done (or is still ambiguous due to considerable evolutionary reduction). Possible pseudanthia of this type may occur in the following families:

- Araceae — in subfamily Lemnoideae
- Hydatellaceae
- Pandanaceae
- Phyllanthaceae
- Triuridaceae

== Gallery ==
Diagram of a flower head. Note bracts surrounding the flowers, which would be absent on a capitulum.

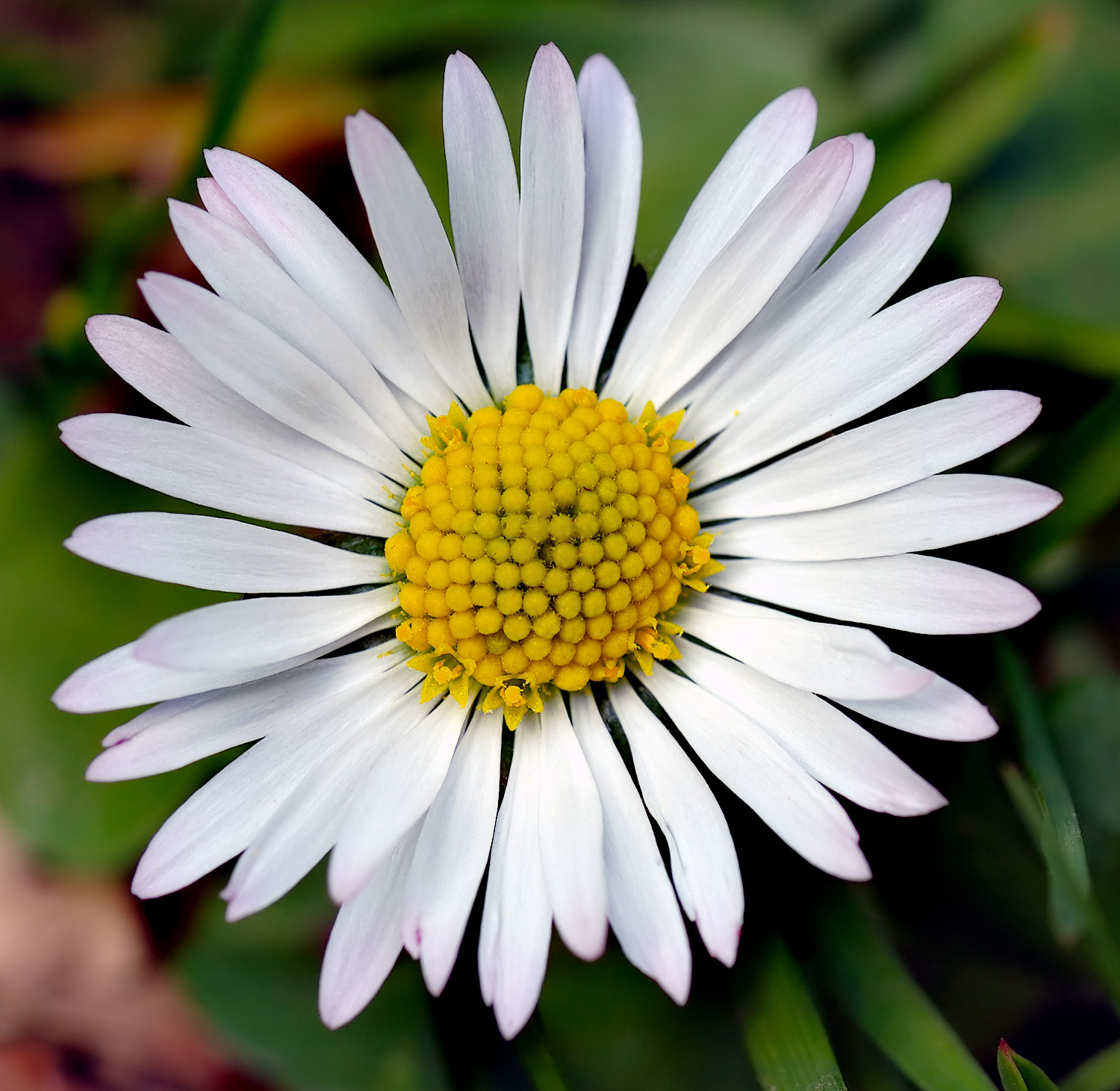
Flower head of a common daisy (Bellis perennis)

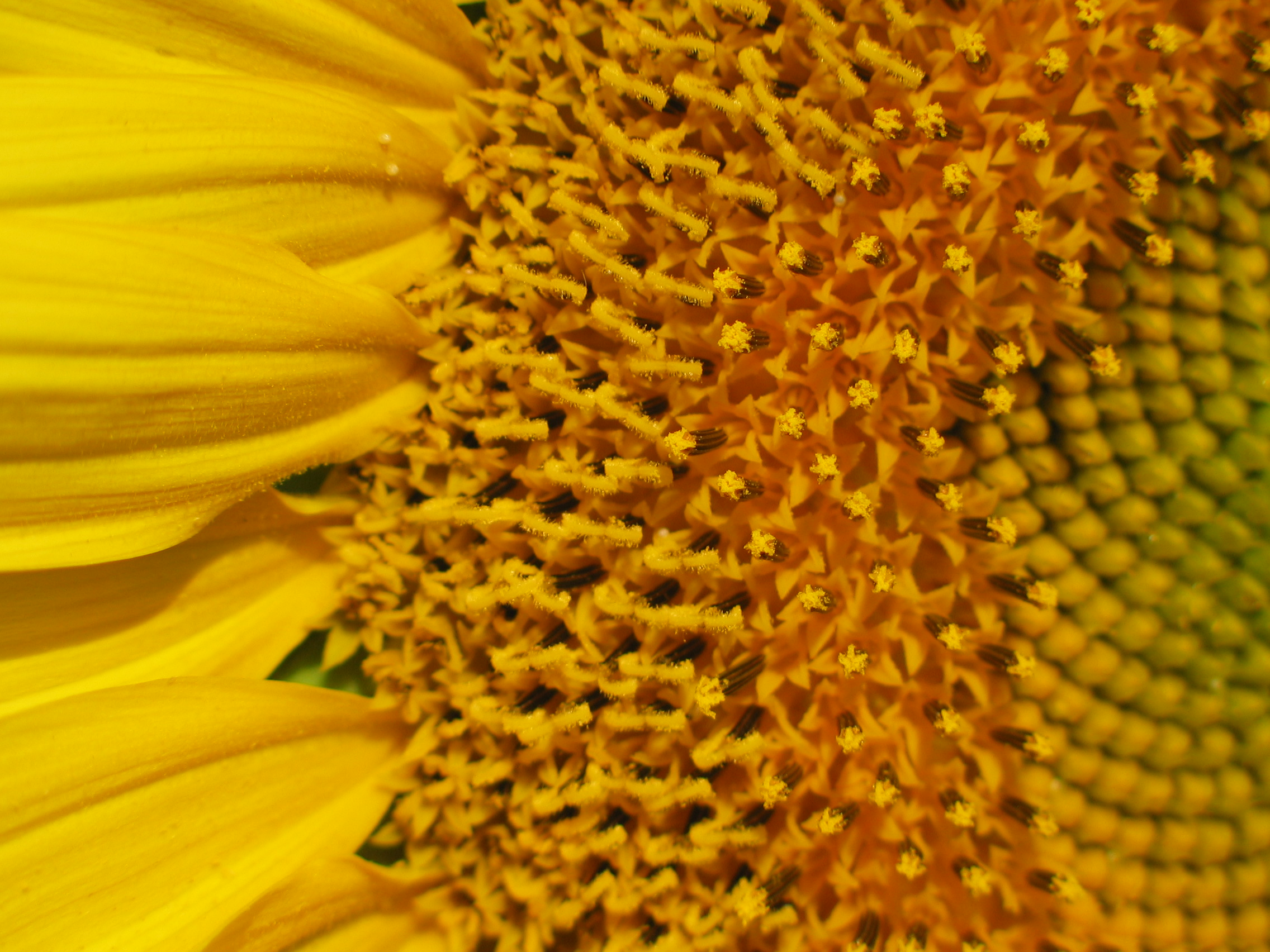
Flowers open in succession in head of a sunflower (Helianthus annuus), with ray florets forming the 'petals'

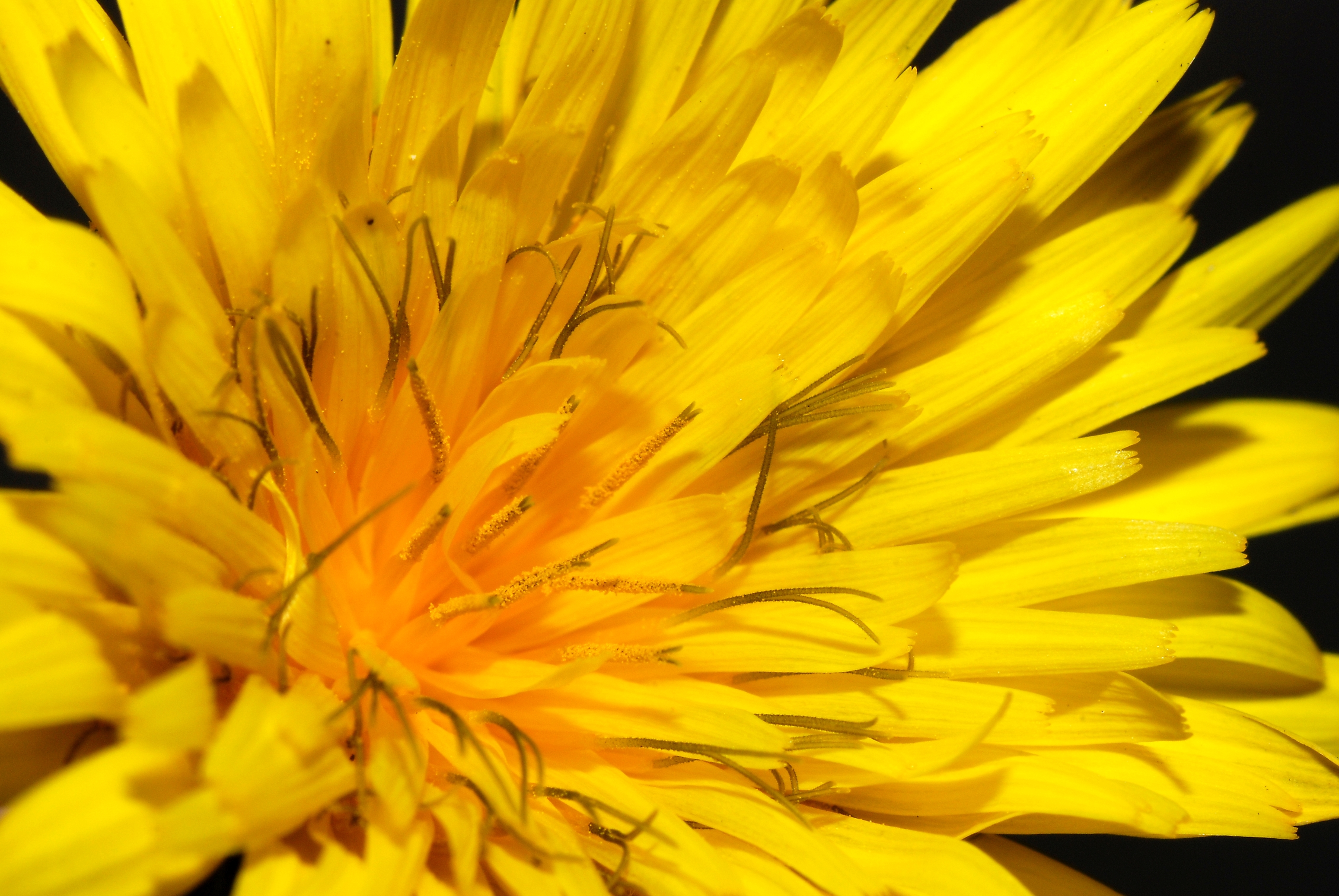
Close up of the ray corolla of Hieracium lachenalii; every "petal" is actually a separate five-petaled flower complete with its own stamens and making its own fruit.

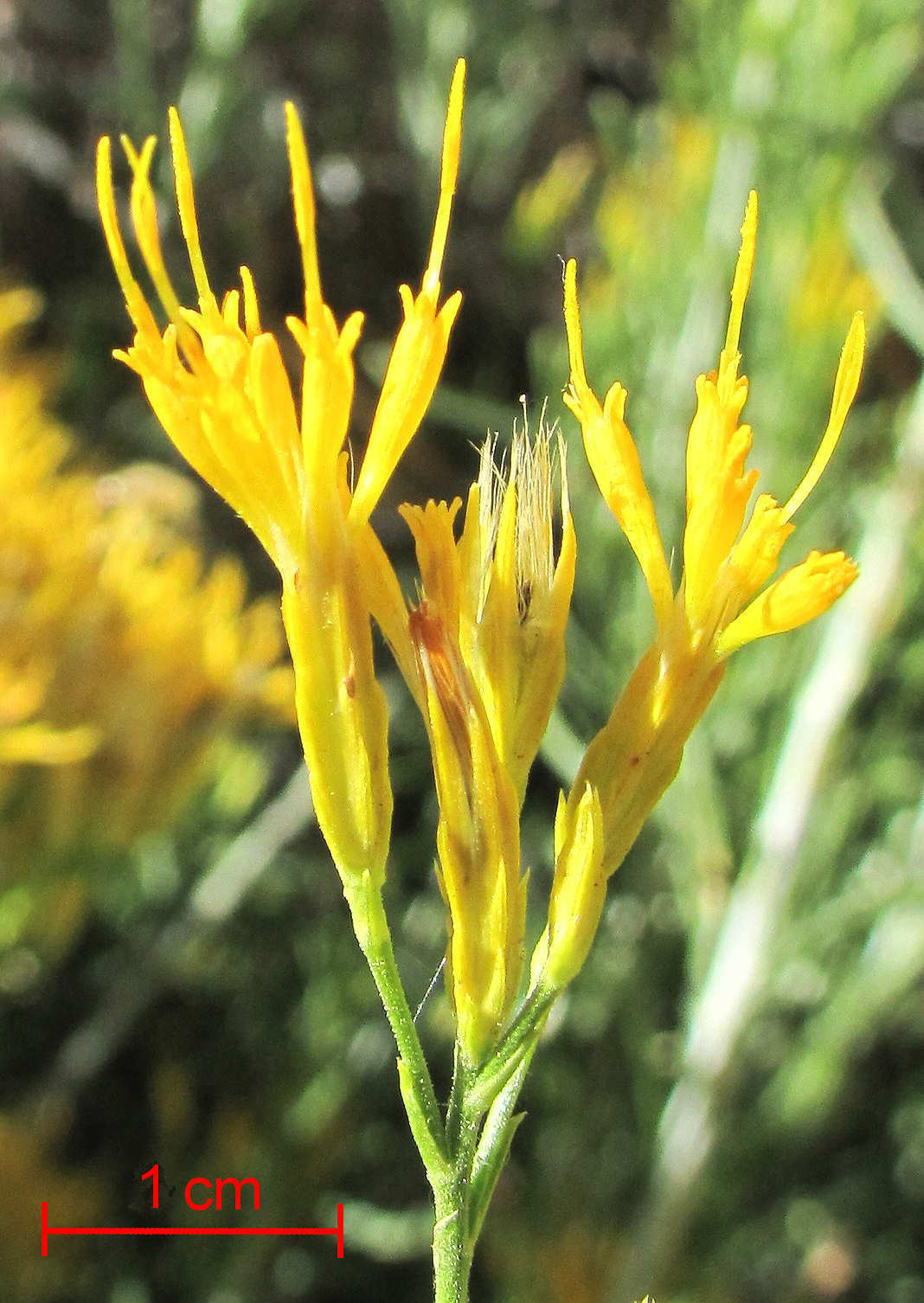
Discoid (having only disk flowers) flower heads of Ericameria nauseosa (rubber rabbitbrush)

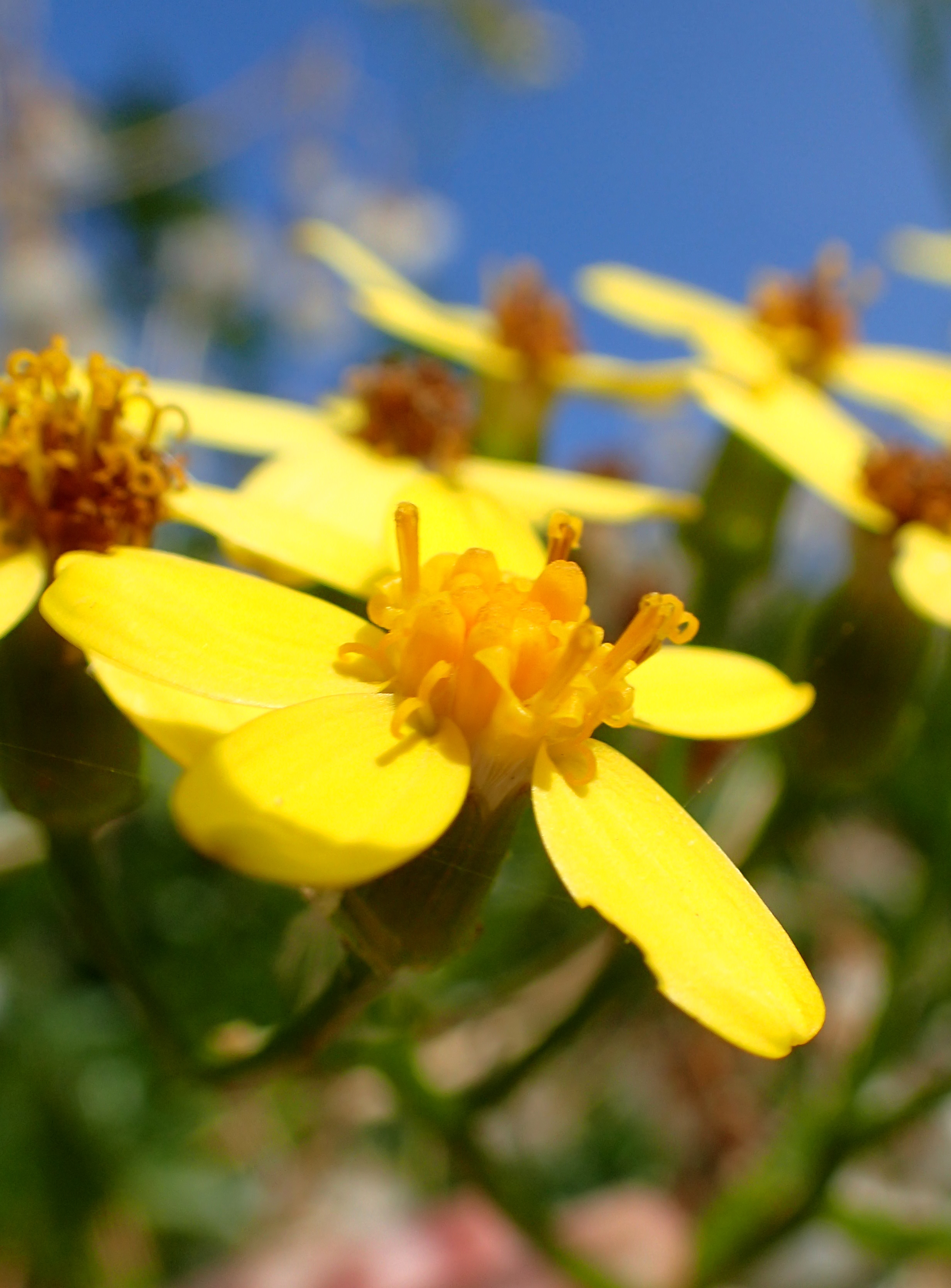
Flower head of creeping groundsel (Senecio angulatus) with petaloid ray florets and tubular disc florets in the middle
