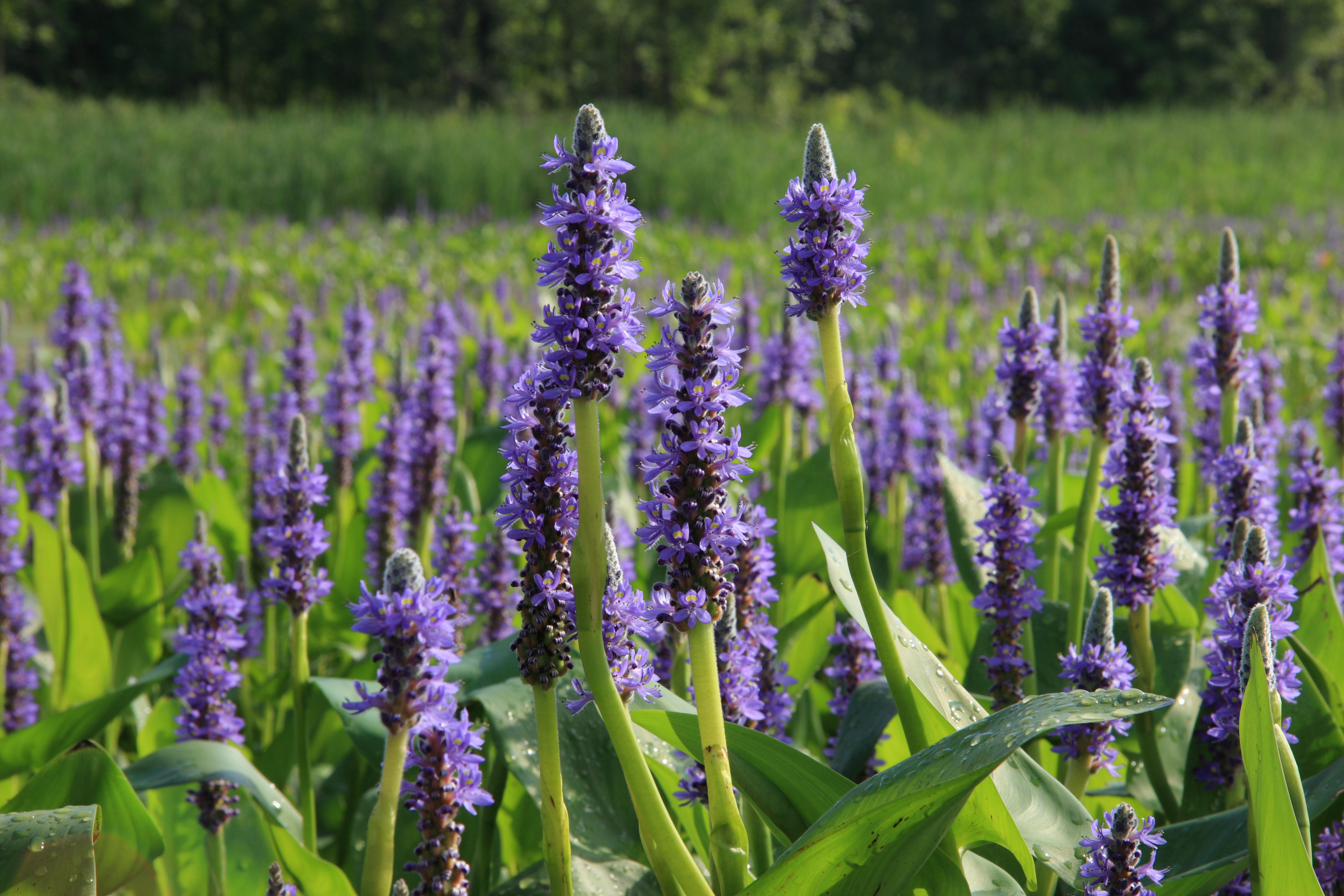

Conservation status
- Secure (NatureServe)

Scientific classification
- Kingdom: Plantae
- Clade: Embryophytes
- Clade: Tracheophytes
- Clade: Angiosperms
- Clade: Monocots
- Clade: Commelinids
- Order: Commelinales
- Family: Pontederiaceae
- Genus: Pontederia
- Species: P. cordata

Binomial name
- Pontederia cordata L.

Synonyms
- Pontederia lanceolata

= Pontederia cordata =

Species of aquatic plant

Pontederia cordata, common name pickerelweed (USA) or pickerel weed (UK), is a monocotyledonous aquatic plant native to the Americas. It grows in a variety of wetlands, including pond and lake margins across an extremely large range from eastern Canada south to Argentina. A few examples include northern rivers, the Everglades and Louisiana.

== Ecology ==
The species grows as an emergent plant, that is, in flooded conditions, so the plant is generally dependent upon aerenchyma in the stem to carry oxygen into the roots. Its metabolism is, however, also tolerant of low soil oxygen. It is often found in areas where water levels fluctuate naturally, with spring flooding and later summer emergence. Apart from flooding, the species is also influenced by soil fertility, tending to grow in the more fertile bays of large lakes, for example. Like many aquatic plants, it is negatively affected by salinity and grazing. It is also negatively affected by competition from other wetland plants. Like many wetland plants, it can survive unfavorable conditions as buried seeds in the soil. In a 36-year study on this species in a sinkhole pond, it was found to have an inverse relationship with American Lotus (Nelumbo lutea), declining in years with high American lotus abundance and increasing in years in with low American lotus abundance.

== Flowers ==
The plant flowers in late summer. The slate blue flowers have yellow markings which may assist in attracting bees for pollination. Two species known to pollinate the flowers are Melissodes apicatus and Dufourea novaeangliae. Once the plant begins to produce seeds, the stem supporting the inflorescence bends to submerge the fruits and seeds. Seeds are dormant at the time of dispersal and will not germinate without stratification for 6–8 weeks.

The flowers of the species are tristylous, meaning the styles of individual plants occur in three different morphs, with most populations containing all three. Leaf shape, which varies considerably across populations, within populations, and even within individuals, has been the source for many taxonomic synonyms. Like many wetland and aquatic plants, the species can reproduce asexually by means of branching rhizomes, and hence can form large clonal stands.

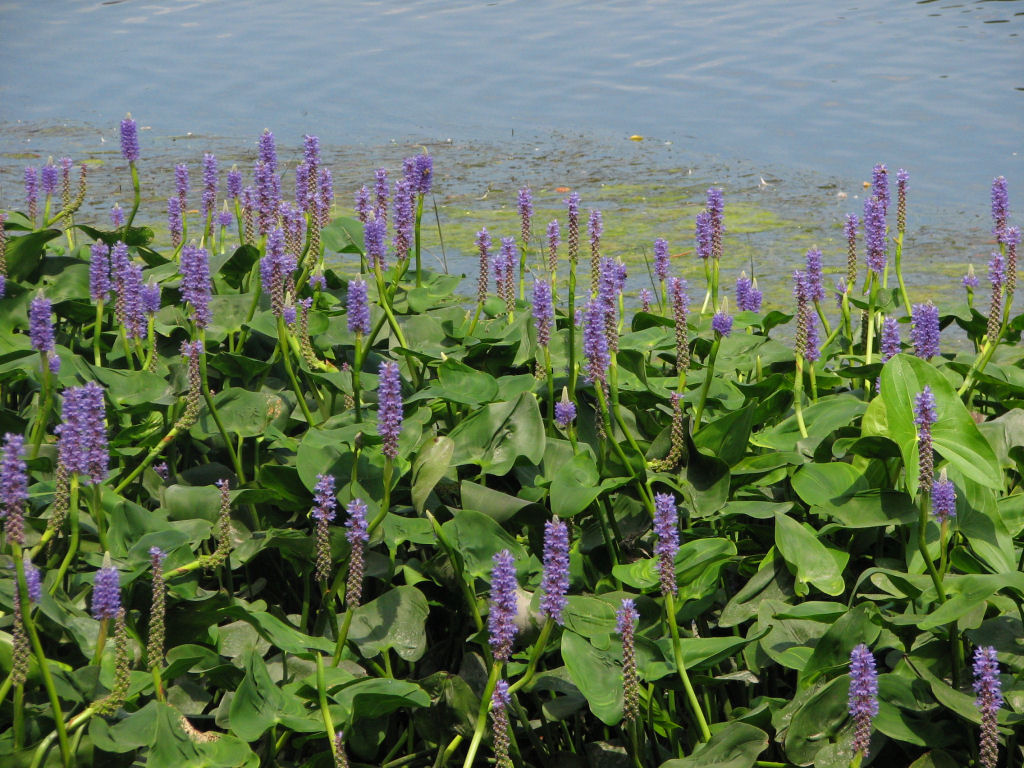
Pickerelweed near Ottawa, Ontario

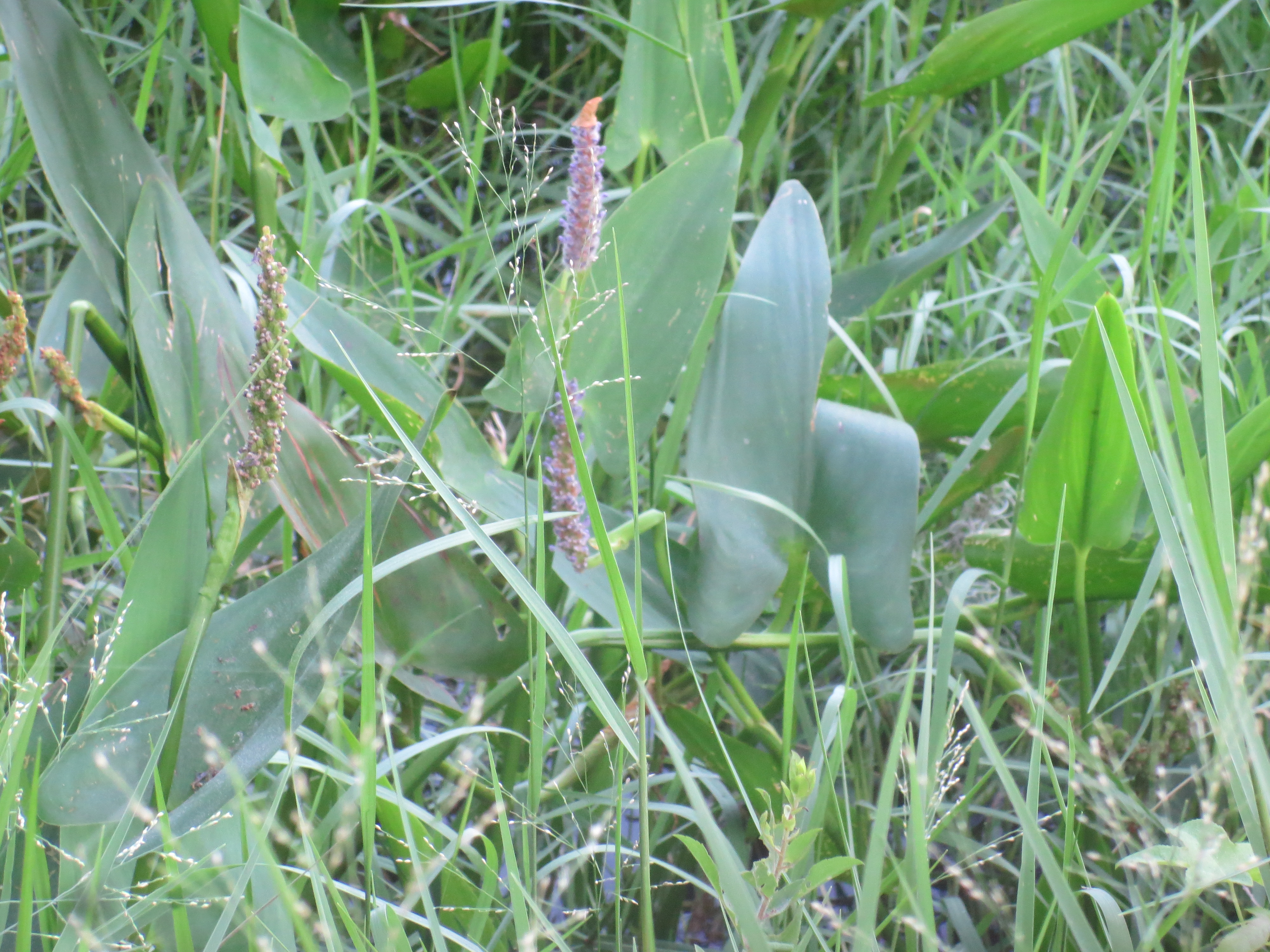
A pickerelweed plant showing green seed pods starting to form, as well as flowers

The small seed pods are green and warty, and are released into the water when ripe.

== Cultivation ==
This plant is cultivated as an ornamental garden pond plant, and has gained the Royal Horticultural Society's Award of Garden Merit.

== Uses ==
The young leafstalks can be eaten raw (with the unripe fruits stripped off) or cooked. The seeds are edible raw, and can be ground into grain.
