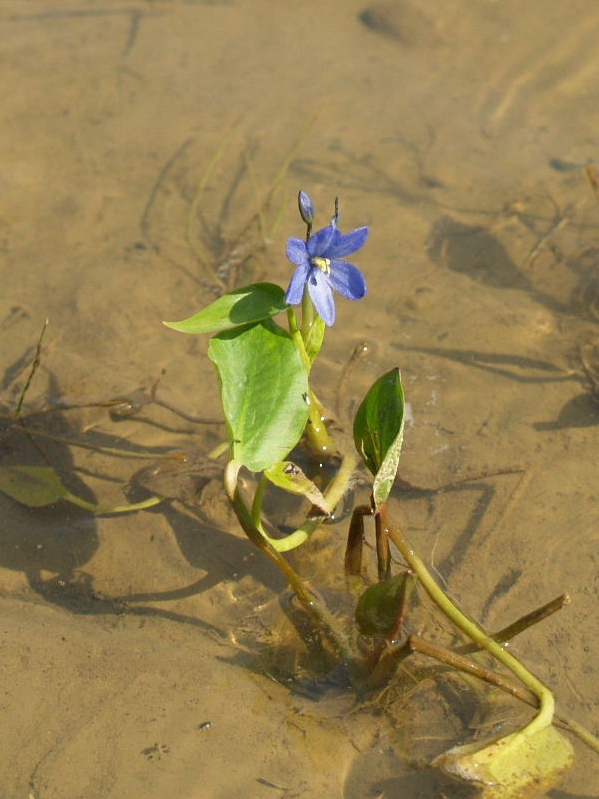
- Pontederia korsakowii

Scientific classification
- Kingdom: Plantae
- Clade: Tracheophytes
- Clade: Angiosperms
- Clade: Monocots
- Clade: Commelinids
- Order: Commelinales
- Family: Pontederiaceae
- Genus: Pontederia; L.

= Monochoria =

Genus of flowering plants

Monochoria was originally a genus of aquatic plants in the water hyacinth family, Pontederiaceae. Currently, it has been reduced to a subgenus of Pontederia, Pontederia subg. Monochoria, represented by ten species (listed below). Its species are native to tropical and subtropical Africa, Asia, and Oceania. They live in the water or in wet soils. They produce leaves on long petioles and some are cultivated for their attractive flowers. Plants from this species have been utilized in the creation of traditional herbal treatments, food, and cosmetics for a very long time.

== Species ==
- Pontederia africana (Solms) M.Pell. & C.N.Horn
- Pontederia australasica (Ridl.) M.Pell. & C.N.Horn
- Pontederia brevipetiolata (Verdc.) M.Pell. & C.N.Horn
- Pontederia cyanea (F.Muell.) M.Pell. & C.N.Horn
- Pontederia elata (Ridl.) M.Pell. & C.N.Horn
- Pontederia hastata L.
- Pontederia korsakowii (Regel & Maack) M.Pell. & C.N.Horn
- Pontederia plantaginea Roxb.
- Pontederia vaginalis Burm. f.
- Pontederia valida (G.X.Wang & Nagam.) M.Pell. & C.N.Horn
