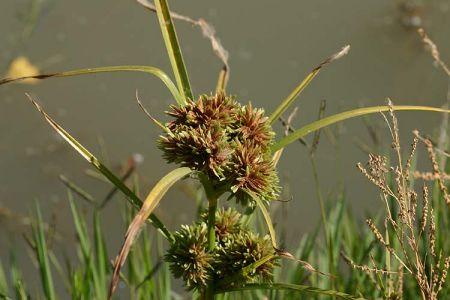

Scientific classification
- Kingdom: Plantae
- Clade: Tracheophytes
- Clade: Angiosperms
- Clade: Monocots
- Clade: Commelinids
- Order: Poales
- Family: Cyperaceae
- Genus: Cyperus
- Species: C. acuminatus

Binomial name
- Cyperus acuminatus Torr. & Hook. ex Torr.

Synonyms
- Cyperus cyrtolepis Torr. & Hook.

= Cyperus acuminatus =

Tatertip flatsedge

Species of plant native to North America

Cyperus acuminatus is a common species of sedge known by several common names, including tapertip flatsedge and pale umbrella-sedge. This plant is native to North America, where it is widespread across the Great Plains and the western United States, with scattered populations in the eastern US as well as in Saskatchewan, Tamaulipas and Coahuila.

Cyperus acuminatus is found in wet areas from large rivers to roadside ditches. This is an annual plant with a paper-thin stem approaching 40 centimetres (1 ft 4 in) in height at maximum. It may have a few thin leaves near the base. Its spherical inflorescence is one to two centimeters wide and contains several spikelets each a few millimeters long. Each spikelet has a flat layer of flowers which yield oval-shaped achene fruits, each about one millimeter long.

== See also ==
- List of Cyperus species
