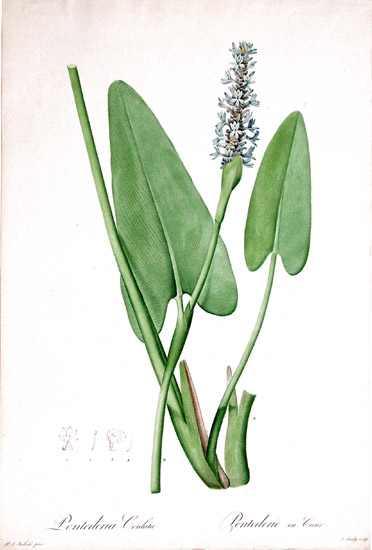
- Pontederia cordata

Scientific classification
- Kingdom: Plantae
- Clade: Tracheophytes
- Clade: Angiosperms
- Clade: Monocots
- Clade: Commelinids
- Order: Commelinales
- Family: Pontederiaceae
- Genus: Pontederia; L.

Species
- See text.

= Pontederia =

Genus of aquatic plants

Pontederia is a genus of tristylous aquatic plants, members of which are commonly known as pickerel weeds. Pontederia is endemic to the Americas, distributed from Canada to Argentina, where it is found in shallow water or on mud. The genus was named by Linnaeus in honour of the Italian botanist Giulio Pontedera.

Pontederia plants have large waxy leaves, succulent stems and a thick pad of fibrous roots. The roots give rise to rhizomes that allow rapid colonization by vegetative reproduction. Species are perennial, and produce a large spike of flowers in the summer. There is a species of bee (Dufourea novaeangliae) that exclusively visits Pontederia cordata; waterfowl also eat the fruit of the plant.

Pontederia cordata and Pontederia crassipes (formerly known as Eichhornia crassipes), have become invasive in many tropical and temperate parts of the globe, but are, on the other hand, efficient biological filters of polluted water in constructed wetlands.

== Species ==
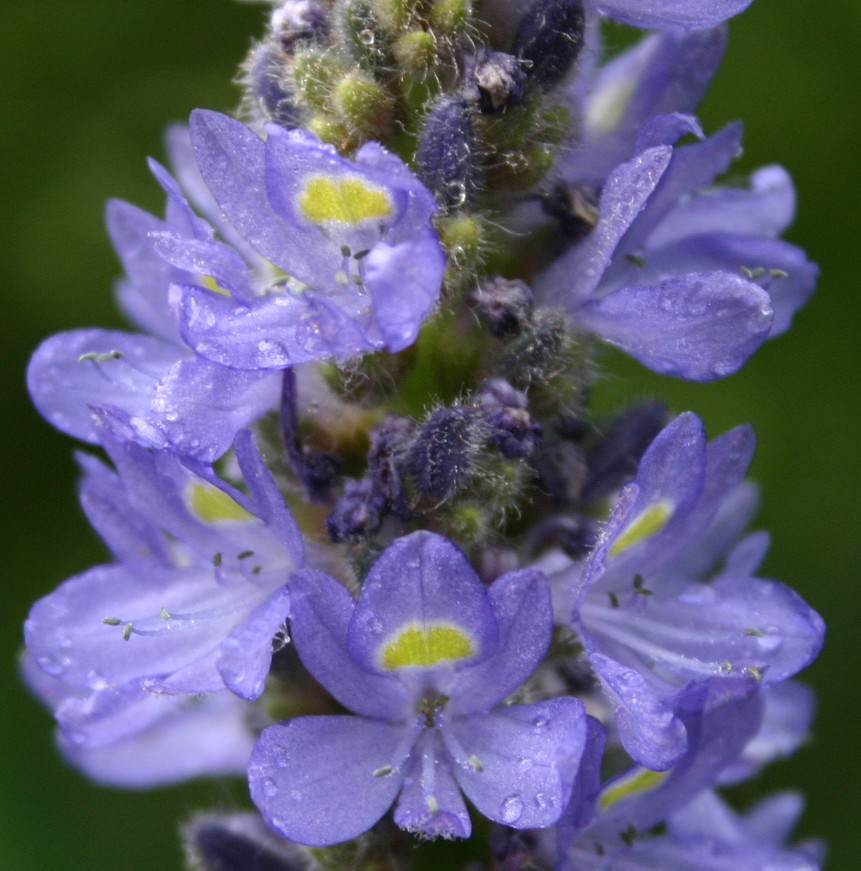
Pontederia cordata

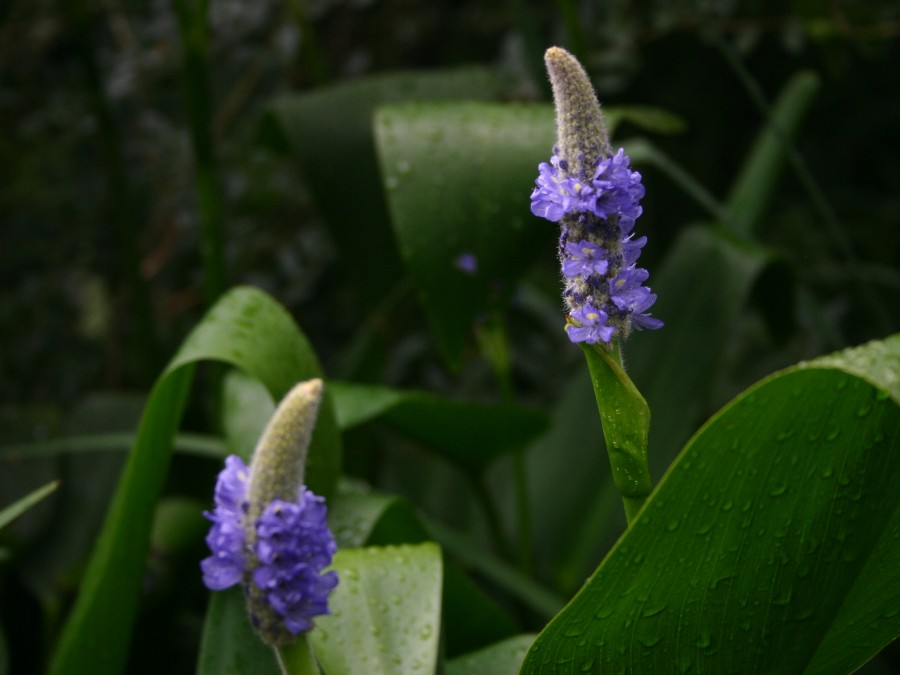
Pontederia cordata

As of January 2024, Plants of the World Online accepted the following species:

- Pontederia africana (Solms) M.Pell. & C.N.Horn
- Pontederia australasica (Ridl.) M.Pell. & C.N.Horn
- Pontederia azurea Sw.
- Pontederia brevipetiolata (Verdc.) M.Pell. & C.N.Horn
- Pontederia cordata L.
- Pontederia crassipes Mart.
- Pontederia cyanea (F.Muell.) M.Pell. & C.N.Horn
- Pontederia diversifolia (Vahl) M.Pell. & C.N.Horn
- Pontederia elata (Ridl.) M.Pell. & C.N.Horn
- Pontederia gigantea D.J.Sousa
- Pontederia hastata L.
- Pontederia heterosperma (Alexander) M.Pell. & C.N.Horn
- Pontederia korsakowii (Regel & Maack) M.Pell. & C.N.Horn
- Pontederia meyeri (A.G.Schulz) M.Pell. & C.N.Horn
- Pontederia natans P.Beauv.
- Pontederia ovalis Mart. ex Schult. & Schult.f.
- Pontederia paniculata Spreng.
- Pontederia paradoxa Mart. ex Schult. & Schult.f.
- Pontederia parviflora Alexander
- Pontederia plantaginea Roxb.
- Pontederia reflexa D.J.Sousa
- Pontederia rotundifolia L.f.
- Pontederia sagittata C.Presl
- Pontederia subovata (Seub.) Lowden
- Pontederia triflora (Seub.) G.Agostini, D.Velázquez & J.Velásquez
- Pontederia vaginalis Burm.f.
- Pontederia valida (G.X.Wang & Nagam.) M.Pell. & C.N.Horn
