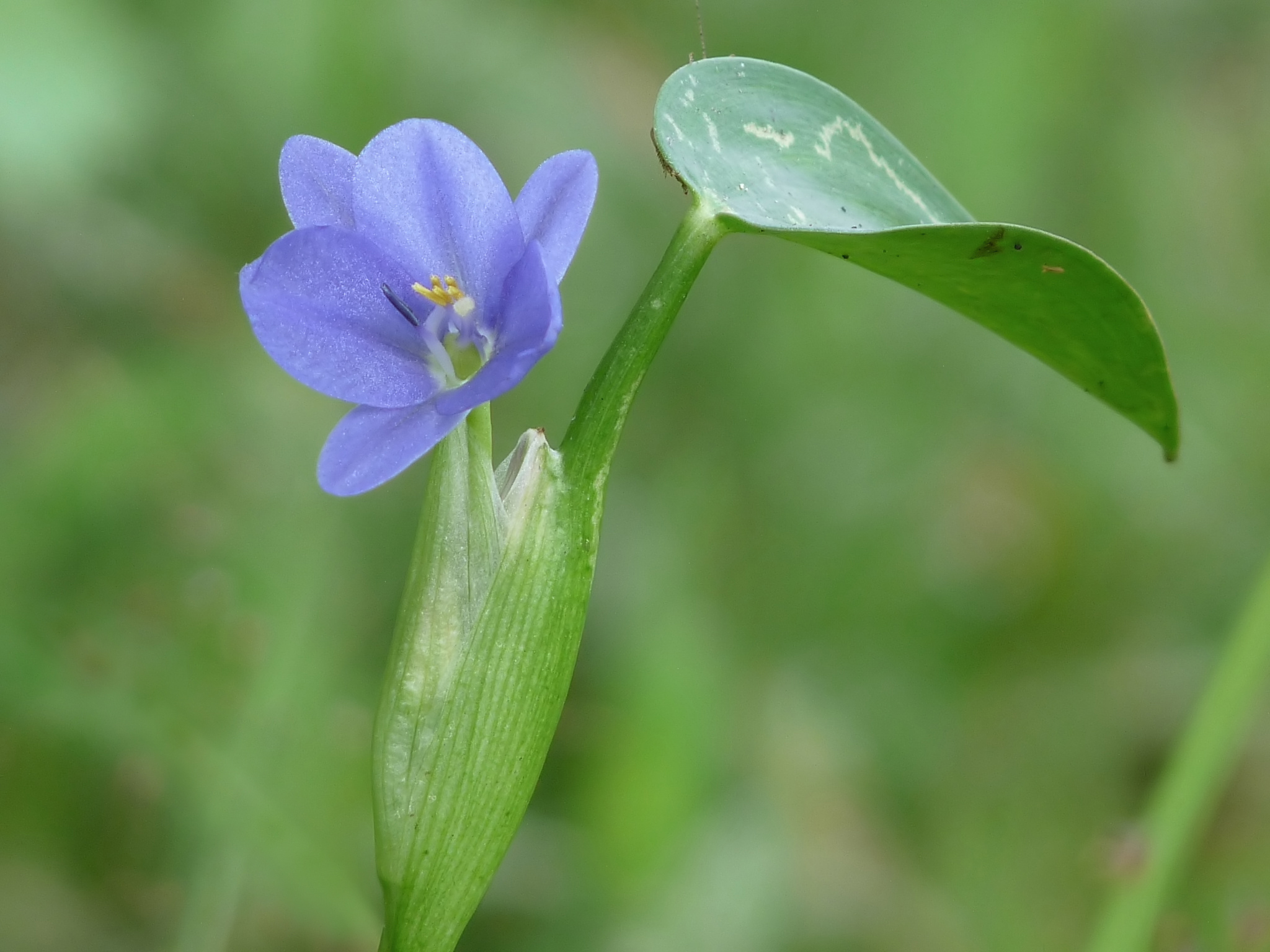

Conservation status
- Least Concern (IUCN 3.1)

Scientific classification
- Kingdom: Plantae
- Clade: Tracheophytes
- Clade: Angiosperms
- Clade: Monocots
- Clade: Commelinids
- Order: Commelinales
- Family: Pontederiaceae
- Genus: Monochoria
- Species: M. vaginalis

Binomial name
- Monochoria vaginalis (Burm.f.) C.Presl ex Kunth

Synonyms
- Gomphima vaginalis (Burm.f.); Monochoria vaginalis (Burm.f.) C.Presl; Monochoria loureiroi Kunth; Monochoria pauciflora (Blume) Kunth; Monochoria vaginalis var. pauciflora (Blume) Merr. Pontederia cordata Lour. Pontederia loureiroana Schult. & Schult.f., J.J.Roemer & J.A.Schultes; Pontederia pauciflora Blume; Pontederia vaginata Royle

= Pontederia vaginalis =

Species of aquatic plant

Monochoria vaginalis is a species of flowering plant in the water hyacinth family known by several common names, including heartshape false pickerelweed and oval-leafed pondweed.

It is native to much of Asia and across many of the Pacific Islands, and it is known in other areas as an introduced species. It is often an invasive noxious weed, and is listed on the United States Federal Noxious Weed List. An aquatic plant, it is invasive in rice paddies and other water bodies. This is an annual or perennial herb growing in water from a small rhizome. It is quite variable in morphology. The shiny green leaves are up to about 12 centimeters long and 10 wide and are borne on rigid, hollow petioles. The inflorescence bears 3 to 25 flowers which open underwater and all around the same time. Each has six purple-blue tepals just over a centimeter long. The fruit is a capsule about a centimeter long which contains many tiny winged seeds.

== Culinary use ==
In northern Luzon in the Philippines, where it is called hahalung, hakhaklung (Ilocano), or saksaklung (Kalinga), the whole young plant is eaten as a vegetable, except for the roots.
