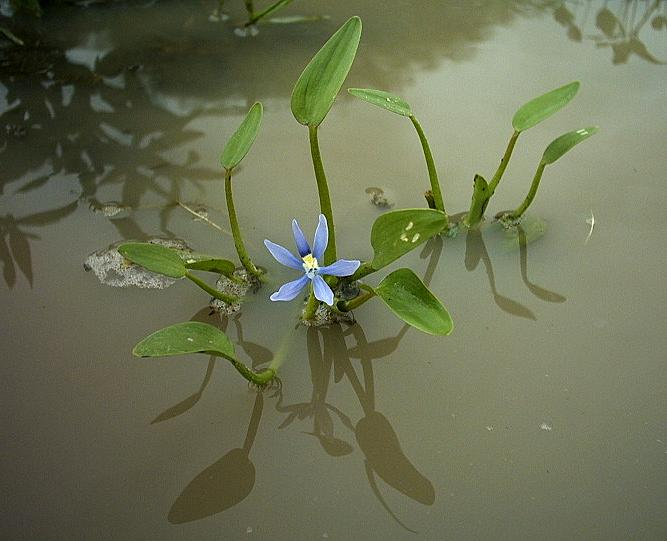
- Heteranthera limosa

Scientific classification
- Kingdom: Plantae
- Clade: Tracheophytes
- Clade: Angiosperms
- Clade: Monocots
- Clade: Commelinids
- Order: Commelinales
- Family: Pontederiaceae
- Genus: Heteranthera; Ruiz & Pav.

Species
- About 12, see text

Synonyms
- Eurystemon Alexander

= Heteranthera =

Genus of flowering plants

Heteranthera is a genus of aquatic plants in the water hyacinth family, Pontederiaceae, known generally as mud plantains. Species of this genus are native to tropical and subtropical America and Africa. They live in the water or in wet soils. They produce leaves on long petioles and some are cultivated for their attractive flowers. Leaves are of two types - linear and submerged or orbicular and floating. Some species have cleistogamic flowers.

== Selected species ==
Accepted species include:

- Heteranthera callifolia Rchb. ex Kunth
- Heteranthera catharinensis C.N.Horn & M.Pell.
- Heteranthera dubia (Jacq.) MacMill.
- Heteranthera gardneri (Hook.f.) M.Pell.
- Heteranthera limosa (Sw.) Willd.
- Heteranthera longirachilla D.J.Sousa & Giul.
- Heteranthera lutea (H.Perrier) M.Pell.
- Heteranthera mexicana S.Watson
- Heteranthera missouriensis C.N.Horn
- Heteranthera multiflora (Griseb.) C.N.Horn
- Heteranthera oblongifolia Mart. ex Schult. & Schult.f.
- Heteranthera pauciflora C.N.Horn
- Heteranthera peduncularis Benth.
- Heteranthera pumila M.Pell. & C.N.Horn
- Heteranthera reniformis Ruiz & Pav.
- Heteranthera rotundifolia (Kunth) Griseb.
- Heteranthera seubertiana Solms
- Heteranthera spicata C.Presl
- Heteranthera yucatana Carnevali, J.L.Tapia & J.R.Grande
- Heteranthera zosterifolia Mart.
