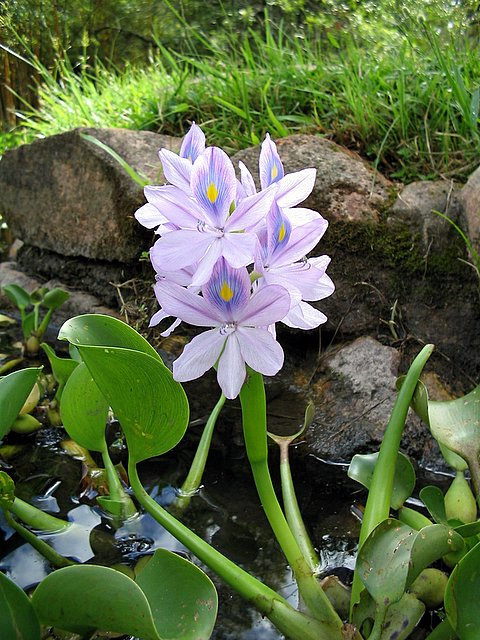
- Pontederia crassipes

Scientific classification
- Kingdom: Plantae
- Clade: Tracheophytes
- Clade: Angiosperms
- Clade: Monocots
- Clade: Commelinids
- Order: Commelinales
- Family: Pontederiaceae; Kunth

Genera
- See text

= Pontederiaceae =

Family of aquatic plants

Pontederiaceae is a family of flowering plants.

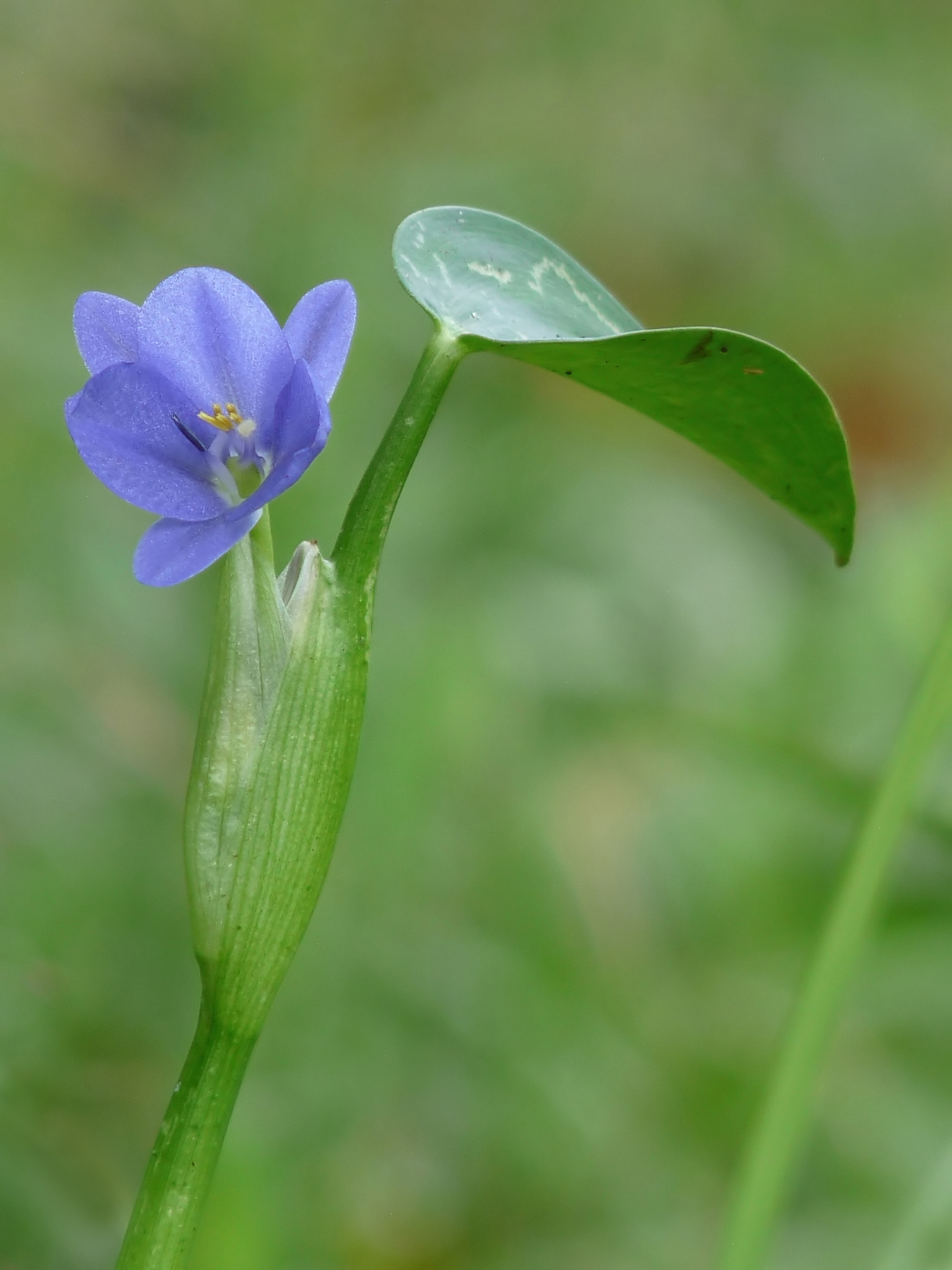
Pontederia plantaginea in Kerala

The APG IV system of 2016 (unchanged from the APG III system of 2009, the APG II system of 2003 and the APG system of 1998) places the family in the order Commelinales, in the commelinid clade, in the monocots. It is a small family of heterostylous aquatic plants, occurring in tropical and subtropical waters. Charles Darwin was interested in the specialized form of heterostyly found in the family, known as tristyly. Not all of the species are heterostylous. The family contains two genera with around 40 known species.

It is best known for the water hyacinth (Pontederia crassipes), which is an invasive species in many waterways. The highly modified Heteranthera gardneri is a submerged aquatic with a two-flowered pseudanthium.

== Taxonomy ==
The two genera within this family are:

- Heteranthera Ruiz & Pav. (including Eurystemon, Hydrothrix, Scholleropsis, and Zosterella)
- Pontederia L. (including Eichhornia, Monochoria, and Reussia)
