= Conostylis albescens =

Conservation status
- Priority Two — Poorly Known Taxa (DEC)

Scientific classification
- Kingdom: Plantae
- Clade: Tracheophytes
- Clade: Angiosperms
- Clade: Monocots
- Clade: Commelinids
- Order: Commelinales
- Family: Haemodoraceae
- Genus: Conostylis
- Species: C. albescens

Binomial name
- Conostylis albescens Hopper
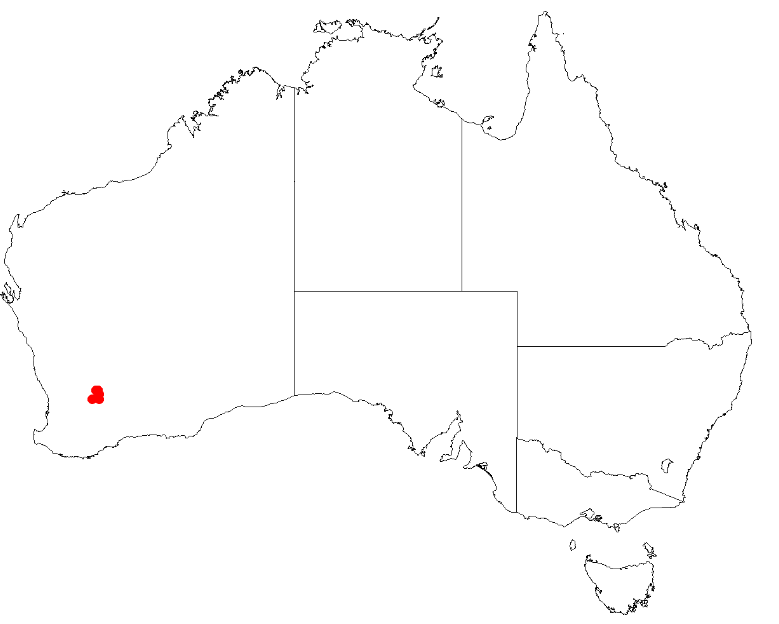
- Occurrence data from AVH

Species of flowering plant

Conostylis albescens is a rhizomatous, tufted perennial, grass-like plant or herb in the family Haemodoraceae and is endemic to inland areas of Western Australia. It is similar to Conostylis bealiana has hairy leaves and yellowish-cream to white tubular flowers.

== Description ==
Conostylis albescens is a rhizomatous, tufted perennial plant with hairy, greyish-green leaves 120–170 mm (4.7–6.7 in) long and 0.8–1.5 mm (0.031–0.059 in) wide. The flowers are borne on peduncle 5–10 mm (0.20–0.39 in) long, each flower on a pedicel 10–25 mm (0.39–0.98 in) long. The perianth is yellowish cream to white and 32–40 mm (1.3–1.6 in) long with lobes 4–7 mm (0.16–0.28 in) long tinged with purple. The stamens are 2.5–3.5 mm (0.098–0.138 in) long and the style is 30–38 mm (1.2–1.5 in) long. Flowering occurs in August.

== Taxonomy ==
Conostylis albescens was first formally described in 1987 by Stephen Hopper in the Flora of Australia. The specific epithet (albescens) means "becoming white".

== Distribution and habitat ==
This species of conostylis is found east of Merredin, where it grows on yellow sandplain in a small region of heath.

== Conservation status ==
Conostylis albescens is listed as "Priority Two" by the Western Australian Government Department of Biodiversity, Conservation and Attractions, meaning that it is poorly known and from only one or a few locations.
