= Conostylis resinosa =

Scientific classification
- Kingdom: Plantae
- Clade: Tracheophytes
- Clade: Angiosperms
- Clade: Monocots
- Clade: Commelinids
- Order: Commelinales
- Family: Haemodoraceae
- Genus: Conostylis
- Species: C. resinosa

Binomial name
- Conostylis resinosa Hopper

Species of flowering plant

Conostylis resinosa is a rhizomatous, tufted perennial, grass-like plant or herb in the family Haemodoraceae and is endemic to the south-west of Western Australia. It has flat, shiny leaves, yellow, tubular flowers and is similar to C. aurea.

== Description ==
Conostylis resinosa is a rhizomatous, tufted, perennial, grass-like plant or herb that typically grows to height of 15–40 cm (5.9–15.7 in) and is similar to C. aurea. It has flat, linear leaves 90–150 mm (3.5–5.9 in) long, 0.7–3.0 mm (0.028–0.118 in) wide and glabrous, apart from bristles on the edges, and at least some small side branches at the base. The leaves are conspicuously shiny with resin. Several flowers are borne on a flowering stem 150–300 mm (5.9–11.8 in) long, each flower 10–12 mm (0.39–0.47 in) long and sessile. The perianth is hairy and yellow, the anthers 4–5 mm (0.16–0.20 in) long and the style is 7–8 mm (0.28–0.31 in) long. Flowering occurs in August and September.

== Taxonomy and naming ==
Conostylis resinosa was first formally described in 1987 by Stephen Hopper in the Flora of Australia, from specimens he collected north of the Murchison River in 1975. The specific epithet (resinosa) means "resinous", referring to the leaves.

== Distribution and habitat ==
This conostylis grows in yellow sand in heath and scrub between Kalbarri National Park and near Arrowsmith in the Avon Wheatbelt, Geraldton Sandplains and Yalgoo bioregions of south-western Western Australia.

== Conservation status ==
Conostylis resinosa is listed as "not threatened" by the Western Australian Government Department of Biodiversity, Conservation and Attractions.
