= Conostylis festucacea =

Scientific classification
- Kingdom: Plantae
- Clade: Tracheophytes
- Clade: Angiosperms
- Clade: Monocots
- Clade: Commelinids
- Order: Commelinales
- Family: Haemodoraceae
- Genus: Conostylis
- Species: C. festucacea

Binomial name
- Conostylis festucacea Endl.
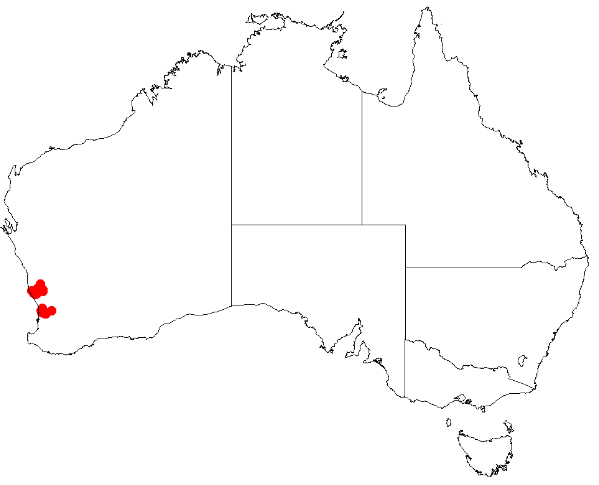
- Occurrence data from AVH

Species of flowering plant

Conostylis festucacea is a rhizomatous, tufted or proliferous perennial, grass-like plant or herb in the family Haemodoraceae, and is endemic to the south-west of Western Australia. It has cylindrical or flat leaves and yellow flowers.

== Description ==
Conostylis festucacea is a rhizomatous, tufted or proliferous perennial, grass-like plant or herb that typically grows to a height of 13–40 cm (5.1–15.7 in). Its leaves are more or less round in cross-section or almost flat, 130–400 mm (5.1–15.7 in) long and 0.8–1.8 mm (0.031–0.071 in) wide and more or less glabrous. The flowers are arranged in loose heads on a flowering stalk 50–190 mm (2.0–7.5 in) long with brown bracts at the base. The perianth is yellow, 8–12 mm (0.31–0.47 in) long with lobes 5.0–7.5 mm (0.20–0.30 in) long. The anthers are 2–4 mm (0.079–0.157 in) long. Flowering occurs in September and October.

== Taxonomy and naming ==
Conostylis festucacea was first formally described in 1846 by Stephan Endlicher in Lehmann's Plantae Preissianae. The specific epithet (festucacea) means "resembling Festuca".

In 1987, Stephen Hopper described two subspecies of C. festucea in Flora of Australia and the names are accepted by the Australian Plant Census:

- Conostylis festucacea Endl. subsp. festucacea has leaves more or less circular in cross-section and 180–400 mm (7.1–15.7 in) and 0.8–1.8 mm (0.031–0.071 in) wide, the flowering stems 80–190 mm (3.1–7.5 in) long.
- Conostylis festucacea subsp. filifolia Endl. has leaves circular in cross-section and 130–400 mm (5.1–15.7 in) and 0.8–1.3 mm (0.031–0.051 in) wide, the flowering stems 50–100 mm (2.0–3.9 in) long.

== Distribution and habitat ==
This species of conostylis grows in sand in winter-wet depressions in heath and low woodland in disjunct populations near Perth, Dandaragan and Watheroo in the Avon Wheatbelt, Geraldton Sandplains, Jarrah Forest and Swan Coastal Plain bioregions of south-western Western Australia. Subspecies festucacea occurs near Perth and Dandaragan and subsp. filifolia is confined to sandplain between Watheroo and Moora.

== Conservation status ==
Both subspecies of Conostylis festucacea are listed as "not threatened" by the Western Australian Government Department of Biodiversity, Conservation and Attractions.
