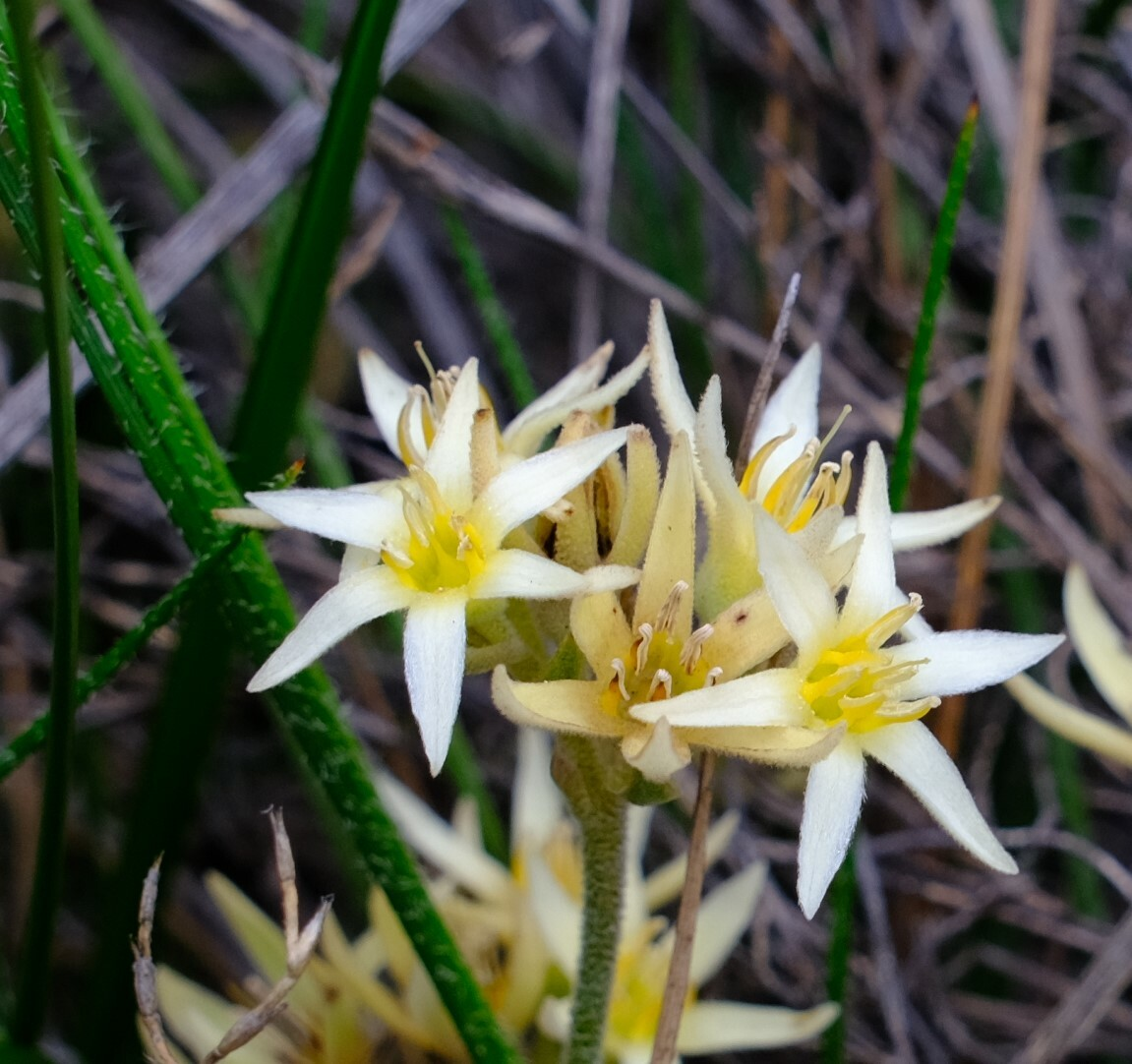

Scientific classification
- Kingdom: Plantae
- Clade: Tracheophytes
- Clade: Angiosperms
- Clade: Monocots
- Clade: Commelinids
- Order: Commelinales
- Family: Haemodoraceae
- Genus: Conostylis
- Species: C. teretiuscula

Binomial name
- Conostylis teretiuscula F.Muell.

= Conostylis teretiuscula =

Species of flowering plant

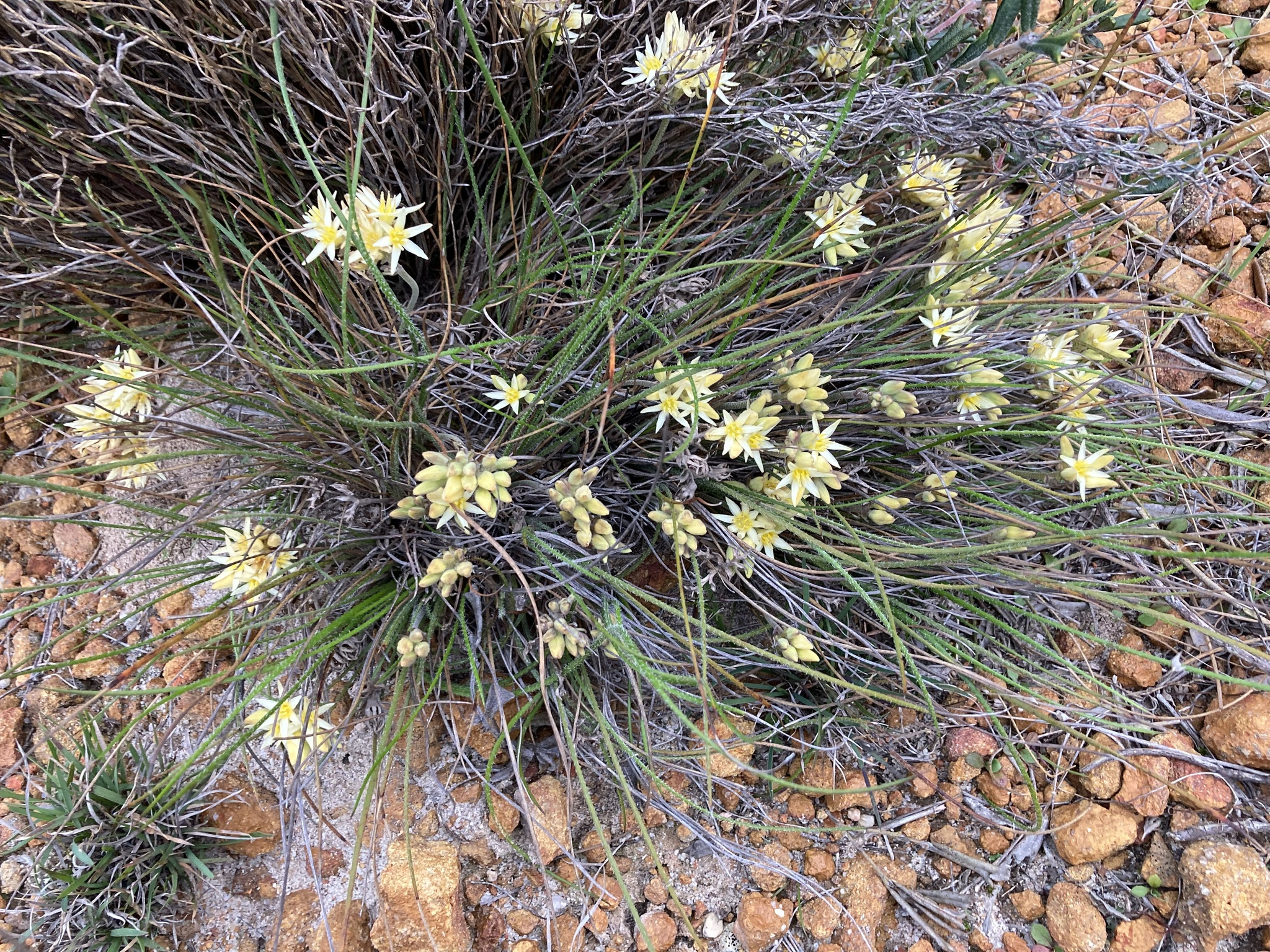
Habit near Jurien Bay

Conostylis teretiuscula is a rhizomatous, tufted perennial, grass-like plant or herb in the family Haemodoraceae and is endemic to the south west of Western Australia. It has flat leaves and yellow, tube-shaped flowers.

== Description ==
Conostylis teretiuscula is a rhizomatous, tufted perennial grass-like plant or herb with tufts up to 20 cm (7.9 in) in diameter. It has flat leaves usually 100–400 mm (3.9–15.7 in) long, 0.5–1.6 mm (0.020–0.063 in) wide with shaggy, silvery hairs. Several flowers 10.0–10.5 mm (0.39–0.41 in) long are borne on a flowering stem 45–80 mm (1.8–3.1 in) long, the flowers yellow and hairy, each on a pedicel 2.0–4.5 mm (0.079–0.177 in) long. The anthers are 2.8–4 mm (0.11–0.16 in) long and the style is 6.5–7.5 mm (0.26–0.30 in) long. Flowering occurs from July to September.

== Taxonomy and naming ==
Conostylis teretiuscula was first formally described in 1873 by Ferdinand von Mueller in his Fragmenta phytographiae Australiae, from specimens collected by Augustus Oldfield. The specific epithet (teretiuscula) means "somewhat terete".

== Distribution and habitat ==
This species of conostylis grows in sandy soil and in clay depressions between the Irwin River and Gingin, and near Walkaway, in the Avon Wheatbelt, Geraldton Sandplains, Jarrah Forest and Swan Coastal Plain bioregions of western Western Australia.

== Conservation status ==
Conostylis teretiuscula is listed as "not threatened" by the Western Australian Government Department of Biodiversity, Conservation and Attractions.
