= Conostylis rogeri =

Conservation status
- Declared rare (DEC)

Scientific classification
- Kingdom: Plantae
- Clade: Tracheophytes
- Clade: Angiosperms
- Clade: Monocots
- Clade: Commelinids
- Order: Commelinales
- Family: Haemodoraceae
- Genus: Conostylis
- Species: C. rogeri

Binomial name
- Conostylis rogeri Hopper

Species of flowering plant

Conostylis rogeri is a rhizomatous, tufted perennial, grass-like plant or herb in the family Haemodoraceae and is endemic to a small area in the south-west of Western Australia. It has small tufts, flat leaves, and a single pale yellow, tubular flower.

== Description ==
Conostylis rogeri is a rhizomatous, perennial, grass-like plant or herb that has small tufts and typically grows to a height of 2.5–5.0 cm (0.98–1.97 in). It has flat, green leaves 25–50 mm (0.98–1.97 in) long, 0.6–1.5 mm (0.024–0.059 in) wide and glabrous, apart from 2 rows of hairs on the edges. A single flower 10–12.5 mm (0.39–0.49 in) long is borne on a flowering stem 5–25 mm (0.20–0.98 in) long, the flowers pale yellow with feathery hairs. The anthers are 3.0–4.5 mm (0.12–0.18 in) long and the style is 5–10 mm (0.20–0.39 in) long. Flowering occurs in September.

== Taxonomy and naming ==
Conostylis rogersi was first formally described in 1987 by Stephen Hopper in the Flora of Australia, from specimens he collected in a nature reserve near Kulin in 1978. The specific epithet (rogeri) honours Roger Hnatiuk.

== Distribution and habitat ==
This conostylis grows in rises over sand in low heath and scrub and is only known in the Mallee bioregion of south-western Western Australia.

== Conservation status ==
Conostylis rogeri is listed as "Threatened" by the Western Australian Government Department of Biodiversity, Conservation and Attractions, meaning that it is in danger of extinction.
