= Conostylis latens =

Scientific classification
- Kingdom: Plantae
- Clade: Tracheophytes
- Clade: Angiosperms
- Clade: Monocots
- Clade: Commelinids
- Order: Commelinales
- Family: Haemodoraceae
- Genus: Conostylis
- Species: C. latens

Binomial name
- Conostylis latens Hopper

Species of flowering plant

Conostylis latens is a rhizomatous, tufted perennial, grass-like plant or herb in the family Haemodoraceae and is endemic to the south-west of Western Australia. It has flat, green, usually hairy leaves, and greenish-yellow, tubular flowers.

== Description ==
Conostylis latens is a rhizomatous, tufted, perennial, grass-like plant or herb. It has flat, green leaves 100–270 mm (3.9–10.6 in) long and 2.0–3.5 mm (0.079–0.138 in) wide, usually with white, feather-like hairs on the edges. Several flowers are borne on a hemispherical head on a flowering stem 90–200 mm (3.5–7.9 in) long and slightly shorter than the leaves. The perianth is 10–13 mm (0.39–0.51 in) long and pale yellowish-green, ageing to brick red, the lobes 6–8 mm (0.24–0.31 in) long and cream-coloured inside. The anthers are 3–5 mm (0.12–0.20 in) long and the style 8–10 mm (0.31–0.39 in) long. Flowering occurs in August and September.

== Taxonomy and naming ==
Conostylis latens was first formally described in 1987 by Stephen Hopper in the Flora of Australia from specimens he collected on Mount Michaud, 1.5 km (0.93 mi) west of Mount Lesueur in 1982. The specific epithet (latens) means "hidden" or "secret", referring to the fact that the species was overlooked until late in the study of Conostylis.

== Distribution and habitat ==
This conostylis grows in sand or sandy soils over laterite in mallee heath, low woodland, winter-wet areas and swamps, mainly between Mount Lesueur and the Moore River in the Geraldton Sandplains, Jarrah Forest and Swan Coastal Plain bioregions of south-western Western Australia.
