= Conostylis micrantha =

Conservation status
- Vulnerable (EPBC Act)

Scientific classification
- Kingdom: Plantae
- Clade: Tracheophytes
- Clade: Angiosperms
- Clade: Monocots
- Clade: Commelinids
- Order: Commelinales
- Family: Haemodoraceae
- Genus: Conostylis
- Species: C. micrantha

Binomial name
- Conostylis micrantha Hopper

Species of flowering plant

Conostylis micrantha, commonly known as small-flowered conostylis, is a rhizomatous, tufted perennial, grass-like plant or herb in the family Haemodoraceae and is endemic to the south-west of Western Australia. It has leaves that are round in cross-section and have bristles or hairs on the lower edges, and pale yellowish cream, tubular flowers.

== Description ==
Conostylis micrantha is a rhizomatous, perennial, grass-like plant or herb forming tufts up to 30 cm (12 in) in diameter. It has leaves that are round in cross-section, 130–240 mm (5.1–9.4 in) long, 0.7–1.2 mm (0.028–0.047 in) in diameter and glabrous, except for the lower edges of the leaves. The flowers are borne in a forked, flattened head with many flowers on a flowering stem 50–130 mm (2.0–5.1 in) tall with a hairy bract 3–8 mm (0.12–0.31 in) long at the base. The perianth is 5.0–7.5 mm (0.20–0.30 in) long, finely hairy and pale yellowish-cream aging to red, with lobes 2.5–4.5 mm (0.098–0.177 in) long, the anthers 1.0–1.7 mm (0.039–0.067 in) long and the style 3–4 mm (0.12–0.16 in) long. Flowering occurs in July and August.

== Taxonomy and naming ==
Conostylis micrantha was first formally described in 1987 by Stephen Hopper in the Flora of Australia, from specimens he collected near Mount Horner in 1982. The specific epithet (micrantha) means "small-flowered".

== Distribution and habitat ==
This conostylis grows heath on sandplains north of the Irwin River, in the Avon Wheatbelt and Geraldton Sandplains bioregions of south-western Western Australia.

== Conservation status ==
Conostylis micrantha is listed as "vulnerable" under the Australian Government Environment Protection and Biodiversity Conservation Act and as Threatened" by the Western Australian Government Department of Biodiversity, Conservation and Attractions, meaning that it is in danger of extinction.
