= Conostylis petrophiloides =

Scientific classification
- Kingdom: Plantae
- Clade: Tracheophytes
- Clade: Angiosperms
- Clade: Monocots
- Clade: Commelinids
- Order: Commelinales
- Family: Haemodoraceae
- Genus: Conostylis
- Species: C. petrophiloides

Binomial name
- Conostylis petrophiloides F.Muell. ex Benth.

Species of flowering plant

Conostylis petrophiloides is a rhizomatous, tufted perennial, grass-like plant or herb in the family Haemodoraceae and is endemic to the south-west of Western Australia. It has flat, glabrous leaves, and yellowish-cream coloured, tubular flowers.

== Description ==
Conostylis petrophiloides is a rhizomatous, perennial, grass-like plant or herb with tufts up to 50–100 mm (2.0–3.9 in) wide and short stems. Its leaves are flat, 150–300 mm (5.9–11.8 in) long, 1.0–4.5 mm (0.039–0.177 in) wide and glabrous, apart from bristles or hairs on the leaf margins. The flowers are borne in a loose heads on a flowering stem 40–170 mm (1.6–6.7 in) long with a bract 20–30 mm (0.79–1.18 in) long with many flowers, each flower 12–18 mm (0.47–0.71 in) long. The perianth is creamy-yellow, with lobes 8–12 mm (0.31–0.47 in) long, the anthers 4–7 mm (0.16–0.28 in) long and the style 10.0–13.5 mm (0.39–0.53 in) long. Flowering occurs from September to November.

== Taxonomy and naming ==
Conostylis petrophiloides was first formally described in 1873 by George Bentham from an unpublished description by Ferdinand von Mueller, in his Flora Australiensis from specimens collected by Mueller near the Phillips River. The specific epithet (petrophiloides) means "Petrophile-like".

== Distribution and habitat ==
This conostylis grows in sand in heath and mallee shrubland between Dowerin, the Stirling Range and Hopetoun in the Avon Wheatbelt, Coolgardie, Esperance Plains, Jarrah Forest and Mallee bioregions of south-western Western Australia.
