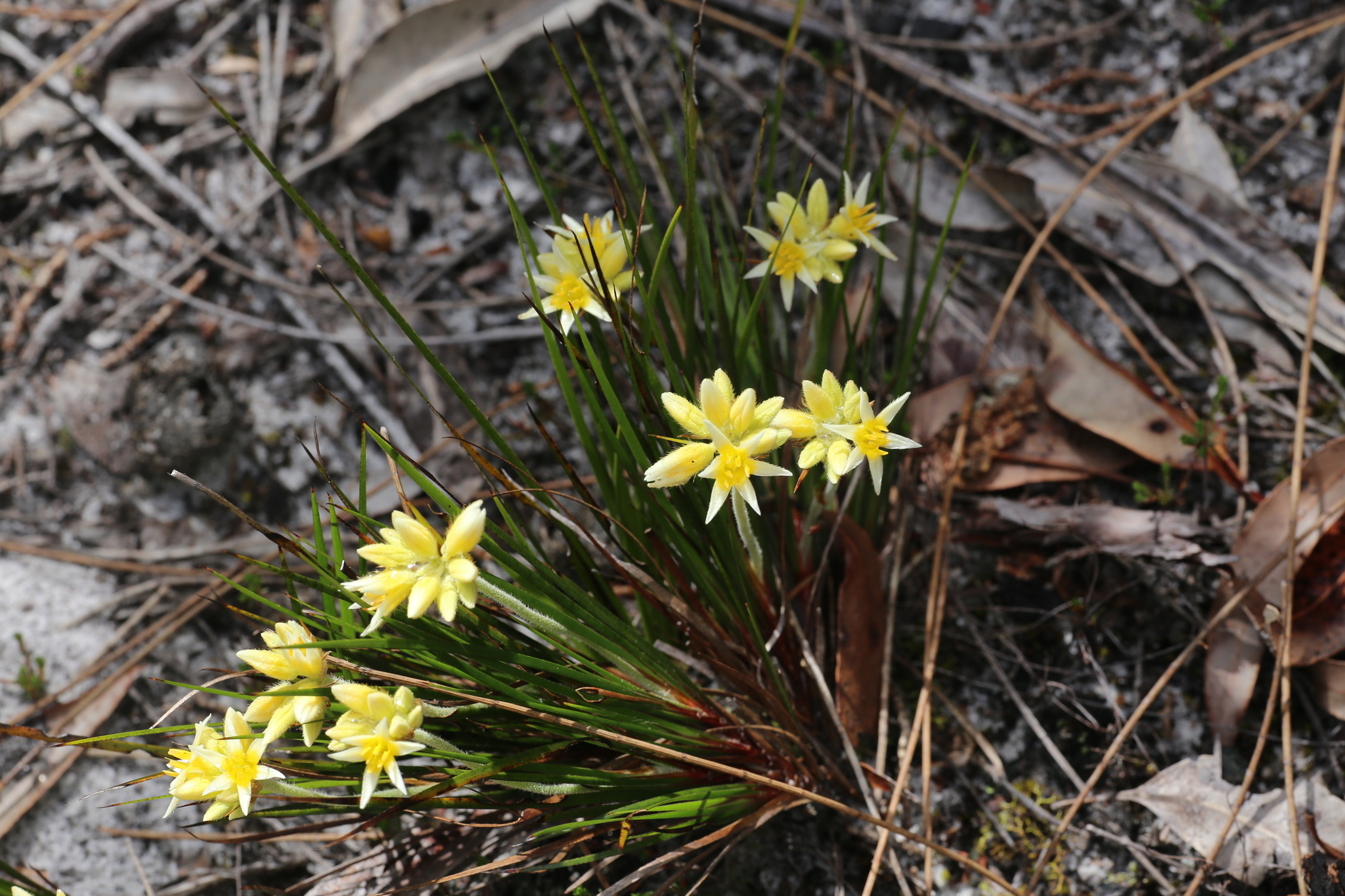
- In Mount Roe National Park

Scientific classification
- Kingdom: Plantae
- Clade: Tracheophytes
- Clade: Angiosperms
- Clade: Monocots
- Clade: Commelinids
- Order: Commelinales
- Family: Haemodoraceae
- Genus: Conostylis
- Species: C. laxiflora

Binomial name
- Conostylis laxiflora Benth.

= Conostylis laxiflora =

Species of flowering plant

Conostylis laxiflora is a rhizomatous, tufted perennial, grass-like plant or herb in the family Haemodoraceae and is endemic to the south-west of Western Australia. It has flat, glabrous leaves, and yellow, tubular flowers.

== Description ==
Conostylis laxiflora is a rhizomatous, tufted, perennial, grass-like plant or herb. It has flat leaves 190–600 mm (7.5–23.6 in) long, 0.7–1.0 mm (0.028–0.039 in) wide and glabrous, apart from bristles or hairs on the leaf margins. The flowers are borne in a loose cyme on a flowering stem 70–130 mm (2.8–5.1 in) long with a bract 7–30 mm (0.28–1.18 in) long subtending several flowers, each flower 13–15 mm (0.51–0.59 in) long on a pedicel 8–10 mm (0.31–0.39 in) long with floral bracts 8–13 mm (0.31–0.51 in) long at the base. The perianth is yellow, with six tepals 7–10 mm (0.28–0.39 in) long, the anthers 4.2–4.5 mm (0.17–0.18 in) long and the style 7.0–7.5 mm (0.28–0.30 in) long. Flowering occurs in October and November.

== Taxonomy and naming ==
Conostylis laxiflora was first formally described in 1873 by George Bentham in his Flora Australiensis from specimens collected by Augustus Oldfield near the Vasse River. The specific epithet (laxiflora) means "open-flowered".

== Distribution and habitat ==
This conostylis grows in sandy soils near swamps and creeks forest and heath in the Jarrah Forest, Swan Coastal Plain and Warren bioregions of south-western Western Australia.
