= Conostylis wonganensis =

Conservation status
- Endangered (EPBC Act)

Scientific classification
- Kingdom: Plantae
- Clade: Tracheophytes
- Clade: Angiosperms
- Clade: Monocots
- Clade: Commelinids
- Order: Commelinales
- Family: Haemodoraceae
- Genus: Conostylis
- Species: C. wonganensis

Binomial name
- Conostylis wonganensis Hopper

Species of flowering plant

Conostylis wonganensis, known as Wongan conostylis, is a rhizomatous, tufted, perennial grass-like plant or herb in the family Haemodoraceae and is an endemic of Southwest Australia. It has glabrous leaves and creamy-yellow, tubular flowers.

== Description ==
Conostylis wonganensis is a rhizomatous, tufted, perennial grass-like plant or herb that typically grows to a height of up to 8–17 cm (3.1–6.7 in). It has many crowded, flat leaves that are elliptical in cross-section, up to 170 mm (6.7 in) long and 0.9 mm (0.035 in) wide. The leaves are glabrous, apart from small spines along the edges. The flowers are mostly 6 mm (0.24 in) long and borne on a woolly-hairy flowering stem 10–30 mm (0.39–1.18 in) high, the flowers creamy-yellow and tube-shaped with lobes mostly about 4.4 mm (0.17 in) long. The anthers are 1.8–3.2 mm (0.071–0.126 in) long and the style 3.3–6.9 mm (0.13–0.27 in) long. Flowering occurs from late July to September.

== Taxonomy ==
Conostylis wonganensis was first formally described in 1982 Stephen Hopper in the journal Nuytsia from specimens collected 4.4 km (2.7 mi) north-west of Wongan Hills. The specific epithet refers to its restricted occurrence near Wongan Hills.

== Distribution and habitat ==
Wongan conostylis is restricted to five extant populations around Wongan Hills, Manmanning and Dowerin. It grows in yellow sand on gradual slopes in heath with emergent mallees.

== Conservation status ==
This species of conostylis is listed as "endangered" under the Australian Government Environment Protection and Biodiversity Conservation Act 1999, and as "Threatened" by the Western Australian Government Department of Biodiversity, Conservation and Attractions, meaning that it is in danger of extinction.
