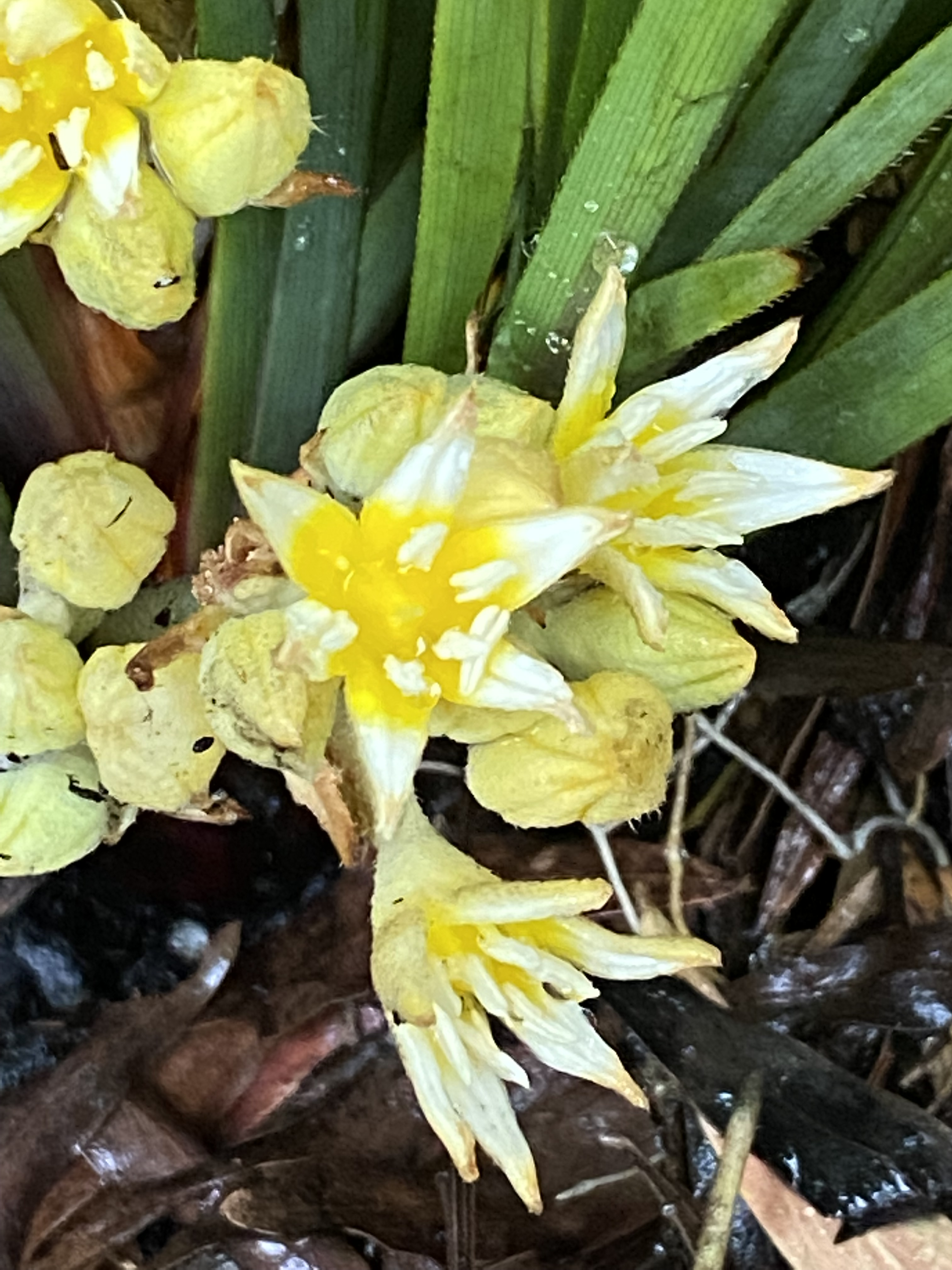

Scientific classification
- Kingdom: Plantae
- Clade: Tracheophytes
- Clade: Angiosperms
- Clade: Monocots
- Clade: Commelinids
- Order: Commelinales
- Family: Haemodoraceae
- Genus: Conostylis
- Species: C. serrulata

Binomial name
- Conostylis serrulata R.Br.

= Conostylis serrulata =

Species of flowering plant

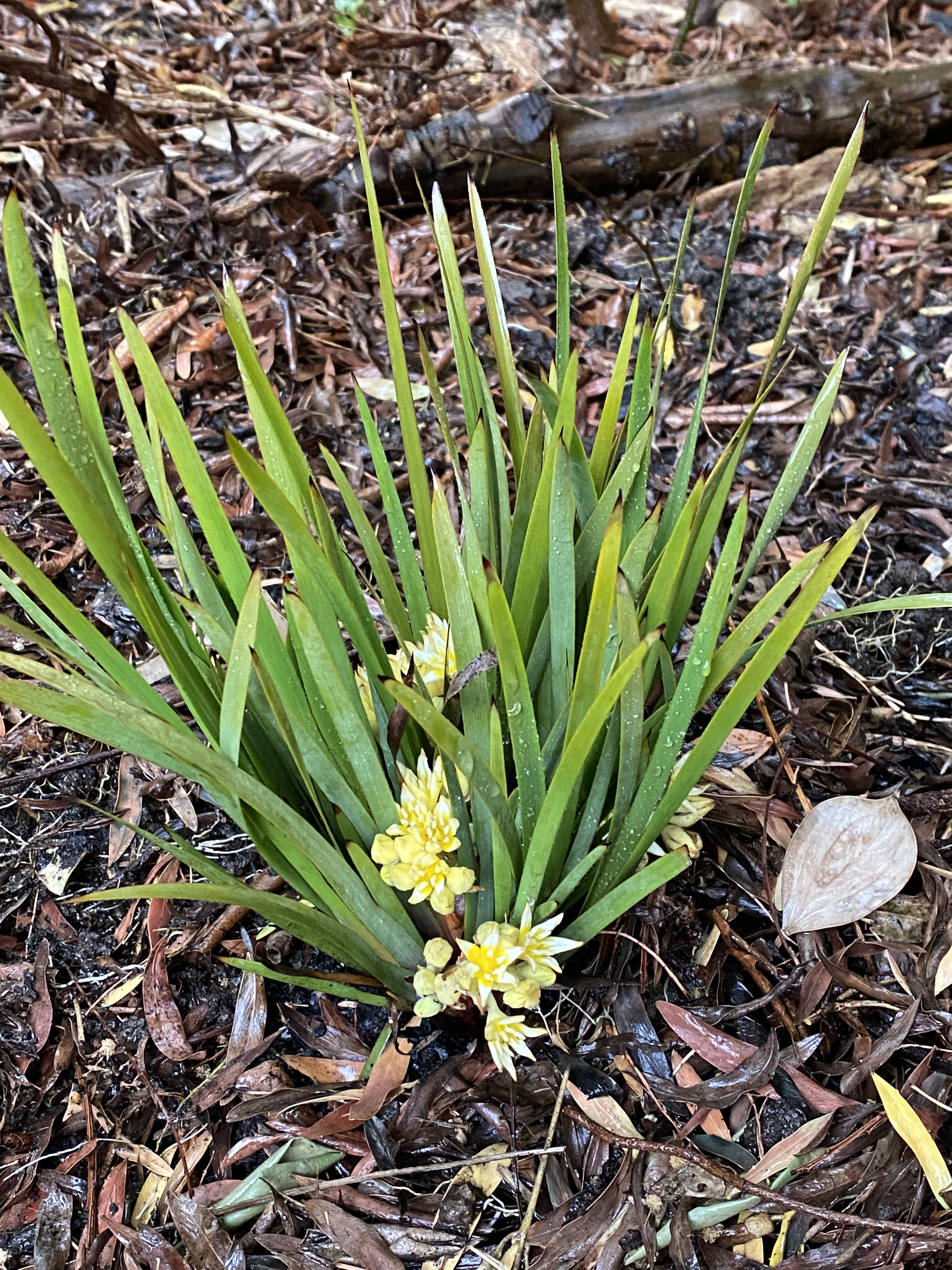
Habit

Conostylis serrulata is a flowering plant in the family Haemodoraceae and is endemic to the south-west of Western Australia. It is a small perennial with yellow cream flowers and flat, green leaves.

== Description ==
Conostylis serrulata is a small, tufted perennial growing from a rhizome and a grass-like habit growing to 0.1–0.4 m (3.9 in – 1 ft 3.7 in) high. It usually has small, stiff, straight branches arising from the base. The leaves are 130–330 mm (5.1–13.0 in) long, and 3.5–6 mm (0.14–0.24 in) wide, hairs on the margins 0.2–0.5 mm (0.0079–0.0197 in) long and a smooth surface. The creamish yellow flowers are 12–15 mm (0.47–0.59 in) long, pedicels 3–10 mm (0.12–0.39 in) long, bracts 5.5–7 mm (0.22–0.28 in) long, and six stamens. Flowering occurs in late winter, September or October.

== Taxonomy and naming ==
Conostylis serrulata was first formally described in 1810 by Robert Brown and the description was published in Prodromus Florae Novae Hollandiae et Insulae Van Diemen. The specific epithet (serrulata) is in reference to the "finely serrate" leaves.

== Distribution and habitat ==
This conostylis grows in laterite gravel on the south coast of Western Australia.
