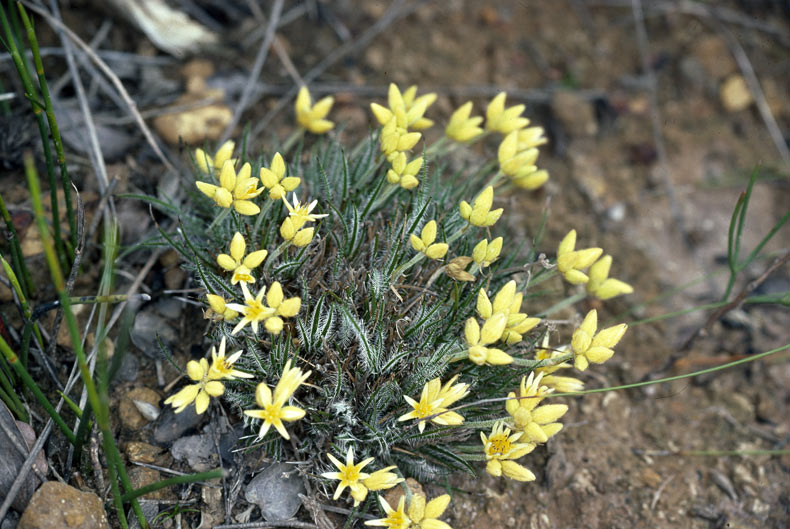
- In the Stirling Range National Park

Scientific classification
- Kingdom: Plantae
- Clade: Tracheophytes
- Clade: Angiosperms
- Clade: Monocots
- Clade: Commelinids
- Order: Commelinales
- Family: Haemodoraceae
- Genus: Conostylis
- Species: C. pusilla

Binomial name
- Conostylis pusilla Endl.

Synonyms
- Conostylis minima Endl.

= Conostylis pusilla =

Species of flowering plant

Conostylis pusilla is a rhizomatous, tufted perennial, grass-like plant or herb in the family Haemodoraceae, and is endemic to the south-west of Western Australia. It has flat leaves and hairy yellow flowers usually arranged in pairs on a flowering stem.

== Description ==
Conostylis pusilla is a rhizomatous, tufted, perennial grass-like plant or herb that typically grows to a height of 20–60 cm (7.9–23.6 in) high. Its leaves are flat, straight and rigid, 25–100 mm (0.98–3.94 in) long and 0.5–1 mm (0.020–0.039 in) wide and glabrous. The flowers are borne in pairs on a flowering stalk 35–110 mm (1.4–4.3 in) long, each flower 4.5–14 mm (0.18–0.55 in) long on a pedicel 1.0–1.5 mm (0.039–0.059 in) long, with a bract 4–5 mm (0.16–0.20 in) long at the base. The perianth is yellow, hairy and 5.0–9.5 mm (0.20–0.37 in) long with lobes 4–8 mm (0.16–0.31 in) long. The anthers are 1.5–2.5 mm (0.059–0.098 in) long and the style is 5–7 mm (0.20–0.28 in) long. Flowering occurs in September and October.

This species is similar to Conostylis setigera, but is smaller in all respects.

== Taxonomy and naming ==
Conostylis pusilla was first formally described in 1846 by Stephan Endlicher in Lehmann's Plantae Preissianae. The specific epithet (pusilla) means "very small".

== Distribution and habitat ==
This species of conostylis grows in sandy loam, clay or sand in woodland and mallee heath from near York to Frankland and Bremer Bay in the Avon Wheatbelt, Esperance Plains, Jarrah Forest and Mallee bioregions of south-western Western Australia.

== Conservation status ==
Conostylis pusilla is listed as "not threatened" by the Western Australian Government Department of Biodiversity, Conservation and Attractions.
