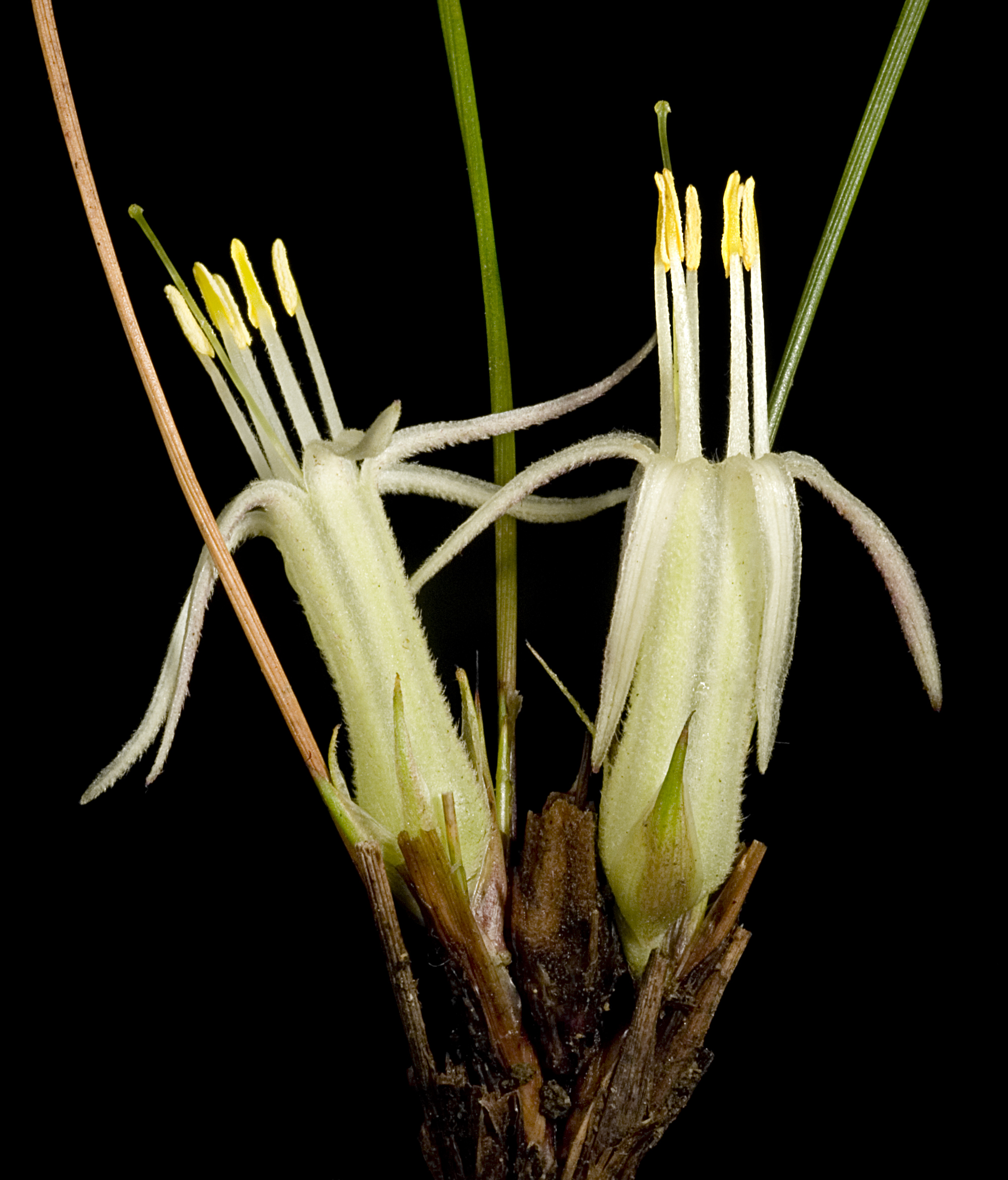

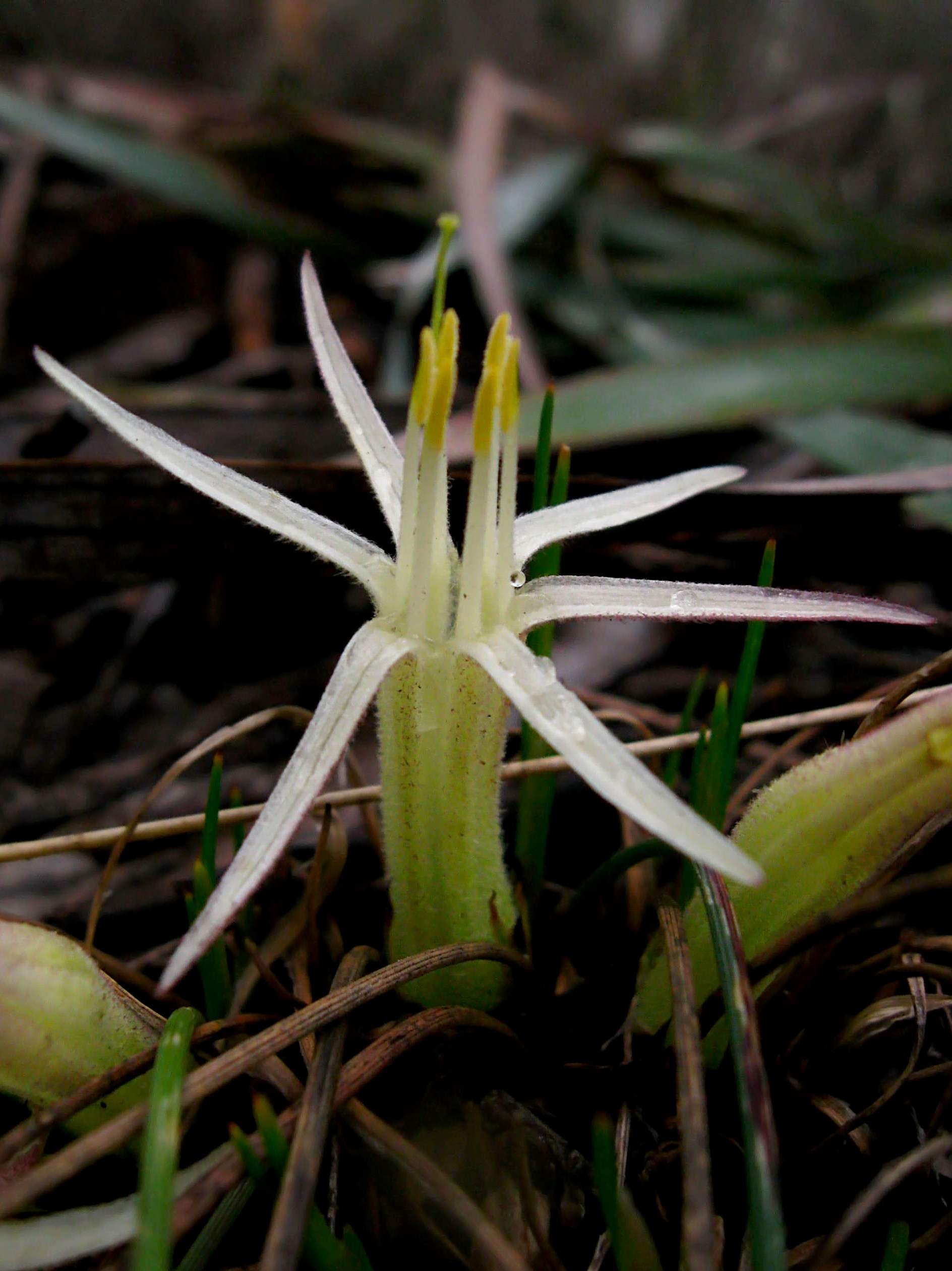

Scientific classification
- Kingdom: Plantae
- Clade: Tracheophytes
- Clade: Angiosperms
- Clade: Monocots
- Clade: Commelinids
- Order: Commelinales
- Family: Haemodoraceae
- Genus: Conostylis
- Species: C. androstemma

Binomial name
- Conostylis androstemma F.Muell.
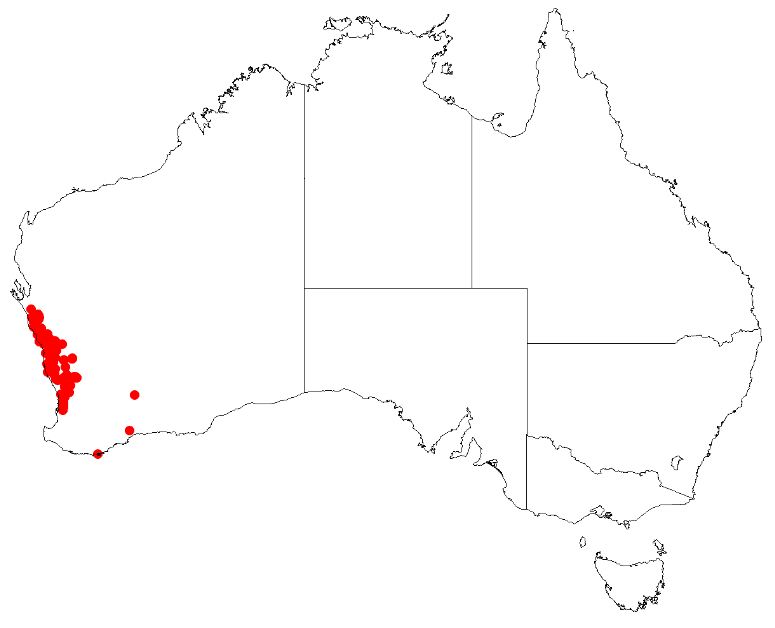
- Occurrence data from AVH

Synonyms
- Androstemma junceum Lindl.

= Conostylis androstemma =

Species of flowering plant

Conostylis androstemma (common name trumpets) is a tufted perennial plant species in the family Haemodoraceae. It is endemic to the south-west of Western Australia. Plants grow to between 10 and 30 cm high and produce cream to pale yellow flowers between May and August in the species' native range.

== Description ==
Conostylis androstemma has green, hairless, terete leaves that are 10–30 cm (3.9–11.8 in) long and about 1 mm (0.039 in) in diameter. The flowers are borne on pedicels that are 4–6 mm (0.16–0.24 in) long, with bracts 8–10 mm (0.31–0.39 in) long and 2 mm (0.079 in) wide at the base. The flowers are white to cream-coloured or yellow, 25–45 mm (0.98–1.77 in) long, hairy and radially symmetrical with lobes that are 15–22 mm (0.59–0.87 in) long. The six stamens are in one level, the anthers 11–12 mm (0.43–0.47 in) long and the style 33–45 mm (1.3–1.8 in) long. Flowering occurs from May to August. The plant resprouts from its rhizomes, after fire.

It is easily distinguished from Conostylis argentea by its terete hairless leaves.

== Taxonomy ==
Originally named Androstemma junceum and described by John Lindley in 1840 in A Sketch of the Vegetation of the Swan River Colony, The species was assigned to the genus Conostylis by botanist Ferdinand von Mueller in 1873 in Fragmenta Phytographiae Australiae and renamed Conostylis androstemma.

== Distribution and habitat ==
Conostylis androstemma grows in lateritic gravel and yellow sand on screes and hilltops, and occurs in south-western Western Australia from Kalbarri National Park to Perth and York in the Avon Wheatbelt, Geraldton Sandplains, Jarrah Forest, Swan Coastal Plain and Yalgoo bioregions of south-western Western Australia.
