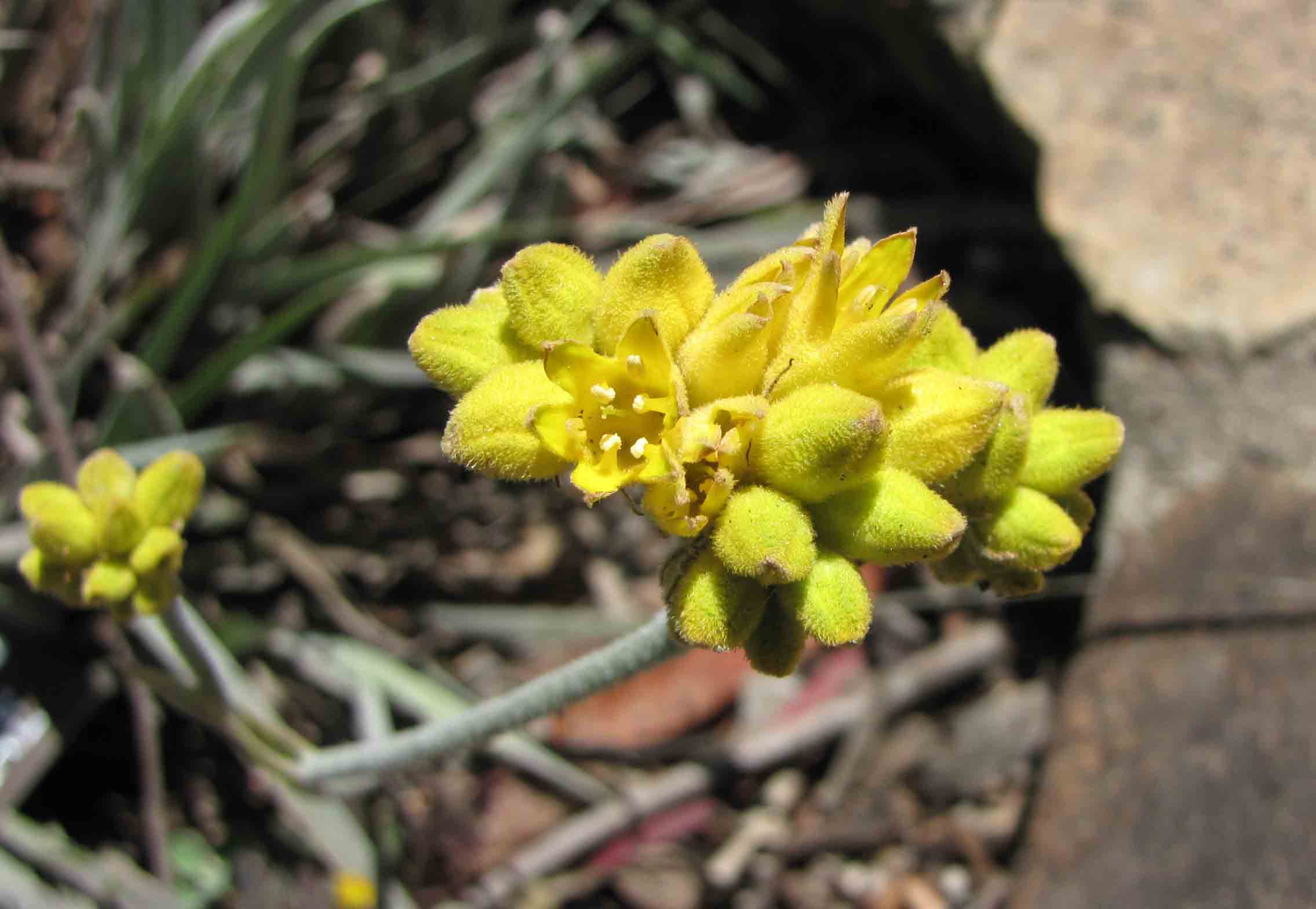

Scientific classification
- Kingdom: Plantae
- Clade: Tracheophytes
- Clade: Angiosperms
- Clade: Monocots
- Clade: Commelinids
- Order: Commelinales
- Family: Haemodoraceae
- Genus: Conostylis
- Species: C. candicans

Binomial name
- Conostylis candicans Endl.

= Conostylis candicans =

Grey cottonseeds

Species of flowering plant

Conostylis candicans, commonly known as grey cottonheads, is a flowering plant in the family Haemodoraceae and is endemic to the south-west of Western Australia. It has grey foliage and bright yellow flower heads.

== Description ==
Conostylis candicans is a perennial herb to 0.05–0.4 m (2.0 in – 1 ft 3.7 in) high that forms a rhizome. The leaves are in loose clusters or tufted, flat, grey, narrow, 5–15 cm (2.0–5.9 in) long and 0.8–2 mm (0.031–0.079 in) wide and the surface densely covered with yellowish or light, grey matted hairs. The scape is about 10–20 cm (3.9–7.9 in) long, thin, flower heads bright yellow, perianth 5–13 mm (0.20–0.51 in) long, globular shaped in bud, loosening with age, bracts 12–45 cm (4.7–17.7 in) long, fleshy, grey, covered in matted hairs. Flowering occurs from August to November.

== Taxonomy and naming ==
Conostylis candicans was first formally described in 1839 by Stephan Friedrich Ladislaus Endlicher and the description was published in Novarum Stirpium Decades. The specific epithet (candicans) means becoming white or whitish.

== Distribution and habitat ==
Grey cottonheads grows in sandy locations in woodland and coastal heath from Shark Bay to the Scott River in Western Australia.
