= Conostylis drummondii =

Conservation status
- Declared rare (DEC)

Scientific classification
- Kingdom: Plantae
- Clade: Tracheophytes
- Clade: Angiosperms
- Clade: Monocots
- Clade: Commelinids
- Order: Commelinales
- Family: Haemodoraceae
- Genus: Conostylis
- Species: C. drummondii

Binomial name
- Conostylis drummondii Benth.
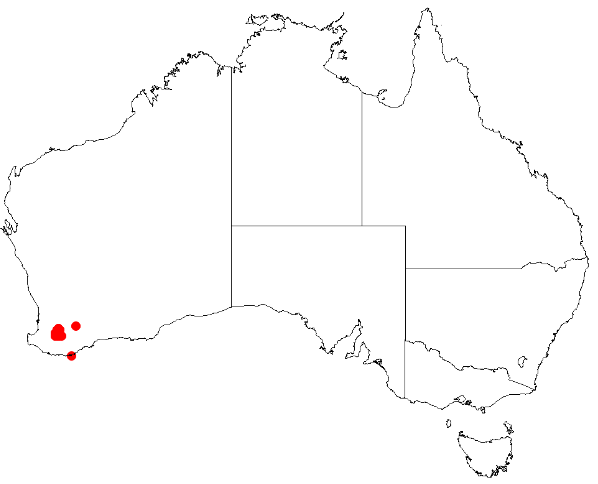
- Occurrence data from AVH

Species of flowering plant

Conostylis drummondii is a rhizomatous, tufted perennial, grass-like plant or herb in the family Haemodoraceae and is endemic to the south-west of Western Australia. It has short stems, and has more or less cylindrical leaves and pale lemon-yellow flowers.

== Description ==
Conostylis drummondii is a rhizomatous, tufted perennial, grass-like plant or herb that forms tufts up to 20 cm (7.9 in) in diameter. Its leaves are more or less round in cross-section, 100–300 mm (3.9–11.8 in) long and 0.5–1.5 mm (0.020–0.059 in) wide and densely covered with fine, woolly, feather-like hairs pressed against the surface. The flowers are arranged in small groups on a hairy flowering stalk 50–80 mm (2.0–3.1 in) long with woolly-hairy bracts. The perianth is pale lemon-yellow, 6–9 mm (0.24–0.35 in) long with lobes 4.0–5.5 mm (0.16–0.22 in) long. The anthers are 2–4 mm (0.079–0.157 in) long and the style 5–7 mm (0.20–0.28 in) long. Flowering occurs in late October and November.

== Taxonomy and naming ==
Conostylis drummondii was first formally described in 1873 by George Bentham in his Flora Australiensis from a specimen collected near King George Sound by James Drummond. The specific epithet (drummondii) honours the collector of the type specimens.

== Distribution and habitat ==
This species of conostylis grows in sand near watercourses in low woodland and heath in a few scattered location near Arthur River and Wagin in the Avon Wheatbelt, Jarrah Forest and Mallee bioregions of south-western Western Australia.

== Conservation status ==
Conostylis drummondii is listed as "Threatened" by the Western Australian Government Department of Biodiversity, Conservation and Attractions, meaning that it is in danger of extinction.
