= Conostylis villosa =

Scientific classification
- Kingdom: Plantae
- Clade: Tracheophytes
- Clade: Angiosperms
- Clade: Monocots
- Clade: Commelinids
- Order: Commelinales
- Family: Haemodoraceae
- Genus: Conostylis
- Species: C. villosa

Binomial name
- Conostylis villosa Benth.

Species of flowering plant

Conostylis villosa is a rhizomatous, tufted perennial, greyish-green, grass-like plant or herb in the family Haemodoraceae and is endemic to the south west of Western Australia. It has flat leaves and yellow flowers aging purplish-red.

== Description ==
Conostylis villosa is a rhizomatous, tufted perennial greyish-green, grass-like plant or herb with small tufts. It has flat leaves 80–200 mm (3.1–7.9 in) long, 0.7–2.0 mm (0.028–0.079 in) wide with soft, shaggy hairs up to 0.9–1.5 mm (0.035–0.059 in) long. Heads of many flowers are borne on a flowering stem 50–120 mm (2.0–4.7 in) long, the flowers 12–15 mm (0.47–0.59 in) long and yellow, aging to purplish-red. The anthers are about 2 mm (0.079 in) long. Flowering occurs in September and October.

== Taxonomy and naming ==
Conostylis teretiuscula was first formally described in 1873 by George Bentham in his Flora Australiensis, from specimens collected by James Drummond. The specific epithet (villosa) means "with long, soft hairs".

== Distribution and habitat ==
This species of conostylis grows in heath and scrub in scattered places between Yerecoin and Wickepin in the Avon Wheatbelt, Jarrah Forest and Mallee bioregions of south-western Western Australia.

== Conservation status ==
Conostylis villosa is listed as "not threatened" by the Western Australian Government Department of Biodiversity, Conservation and Attractions.
