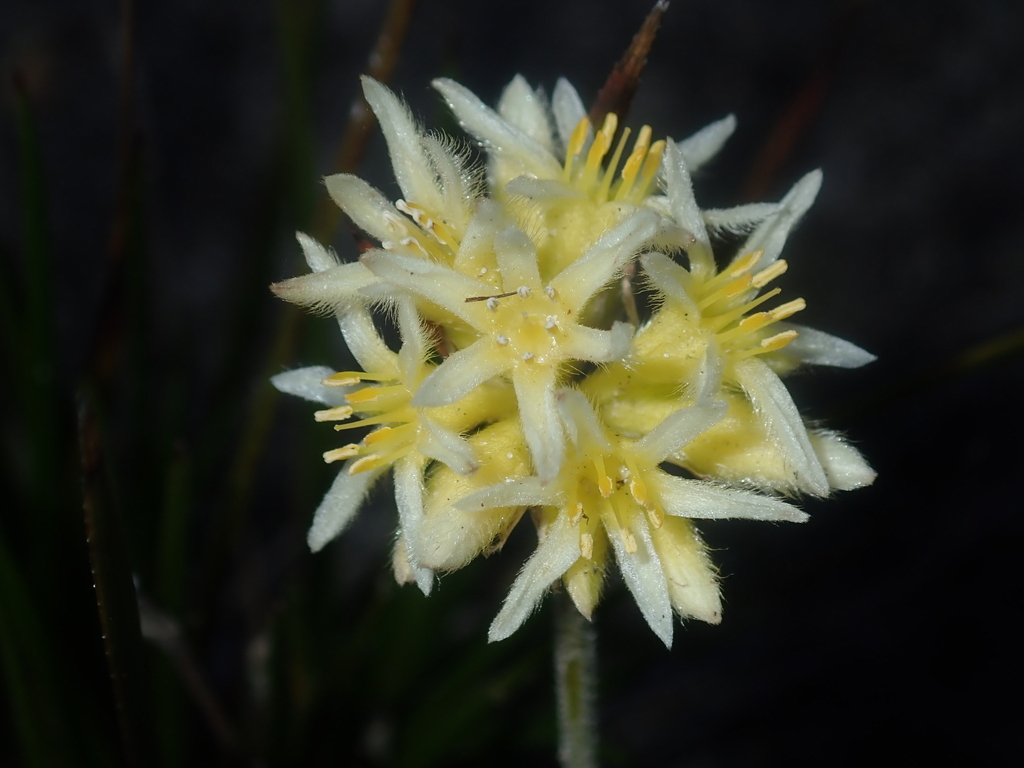

Scientific classification
- Kingdom: Plantae
- Clade: Tracheophytes
- Clade: Angiosperms
- Clade: Monocots
- Clade: Commelinids
- Order: Commelinales
- Family: Haemodoraceae
- Genus: Conostylis
- Species: C. seminuda

Binomial name
- Conostylis seminuda Hopper

= Conostylis seminuda =

Species of flowering plant

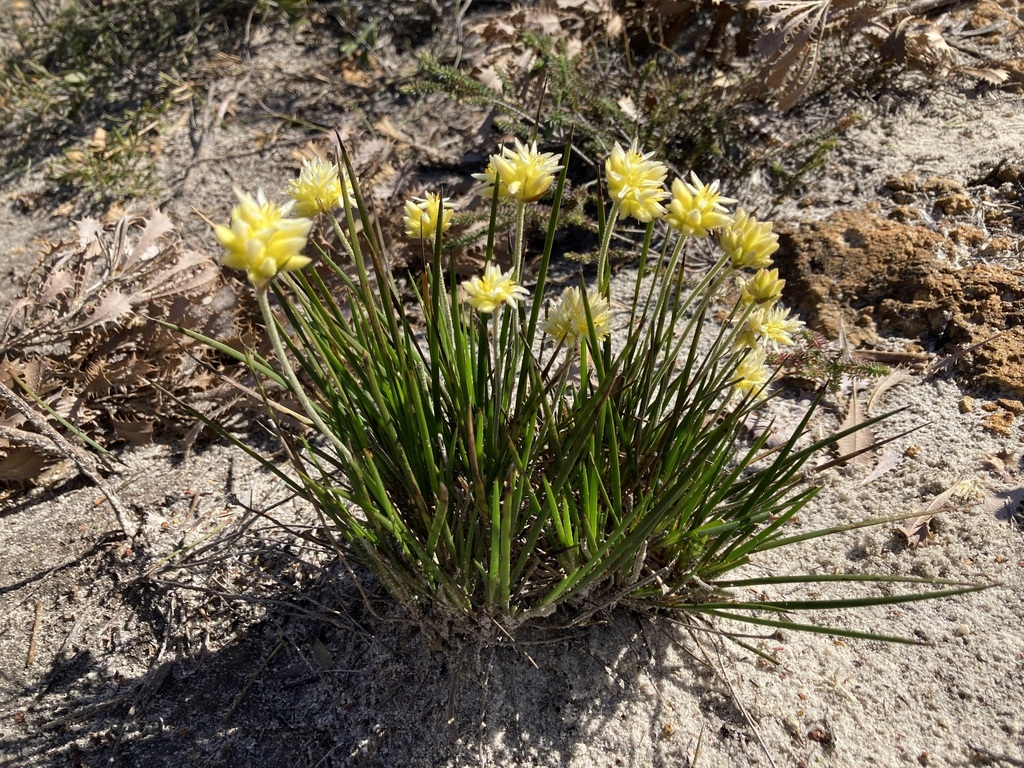
Habit

Conostylis seminuda is a rhizomatous, tufted perennial, grass-like plant or herb in the family Haemodoraceae and is endemic to a small area in the south-west of Western Australia. It has flat leaves and golden yellow, tubular flowers.

== Description ==
Conostylis seminuda is a rhizomatous, tufted, perennial grass-like plant or herb that typically grows to a height of 30 cm (12 in). It has flat leaves 110–210 mm (4.3–8.3 in) long, 1.5–3.5 mm (0.059–0.138 in) wide and glabrous, apart from bristles or hairs on the edges. The flowers are 10.5–12.5 mm (0.41–0.49 in) long and borne on a flowering stem up to 250 mm (9.8 in) long, the flowers golden yellow with lobes 5–8 mm (0.20–0.31 in) long. The anthers are 4.0–5.5 mm (0.16–0.22 in) long and the style is 7.5–9 mm (0.30–0.35 in) long. Flowering occurs in September and October.

== Taxonomy and naming ==
Conostylis seminuda was first formally described in 1987 by Stephen Hopper in the Flora of Australia, from specimens he collected 4 km (2.5 mi) west of the Brand Highway, east of Jurien Bay in 1982. The specific epithet (seminuda) means "half-naked", referring to the sparsely-hairy leaves.

== Distribution and habitat ==
This conostylis grows in sand in low heath in a small area between Mount Lesueur and Alexander Morrison National Park in the Geraldton Sandplains and Swan Coastal Plain bioregions of south-western Western Australia.

== Conservation status ==
Conostylis seminuda is listed as "not threatened" by the Western Australian Government Department of Biodiversity, Conservation and Attractions.
