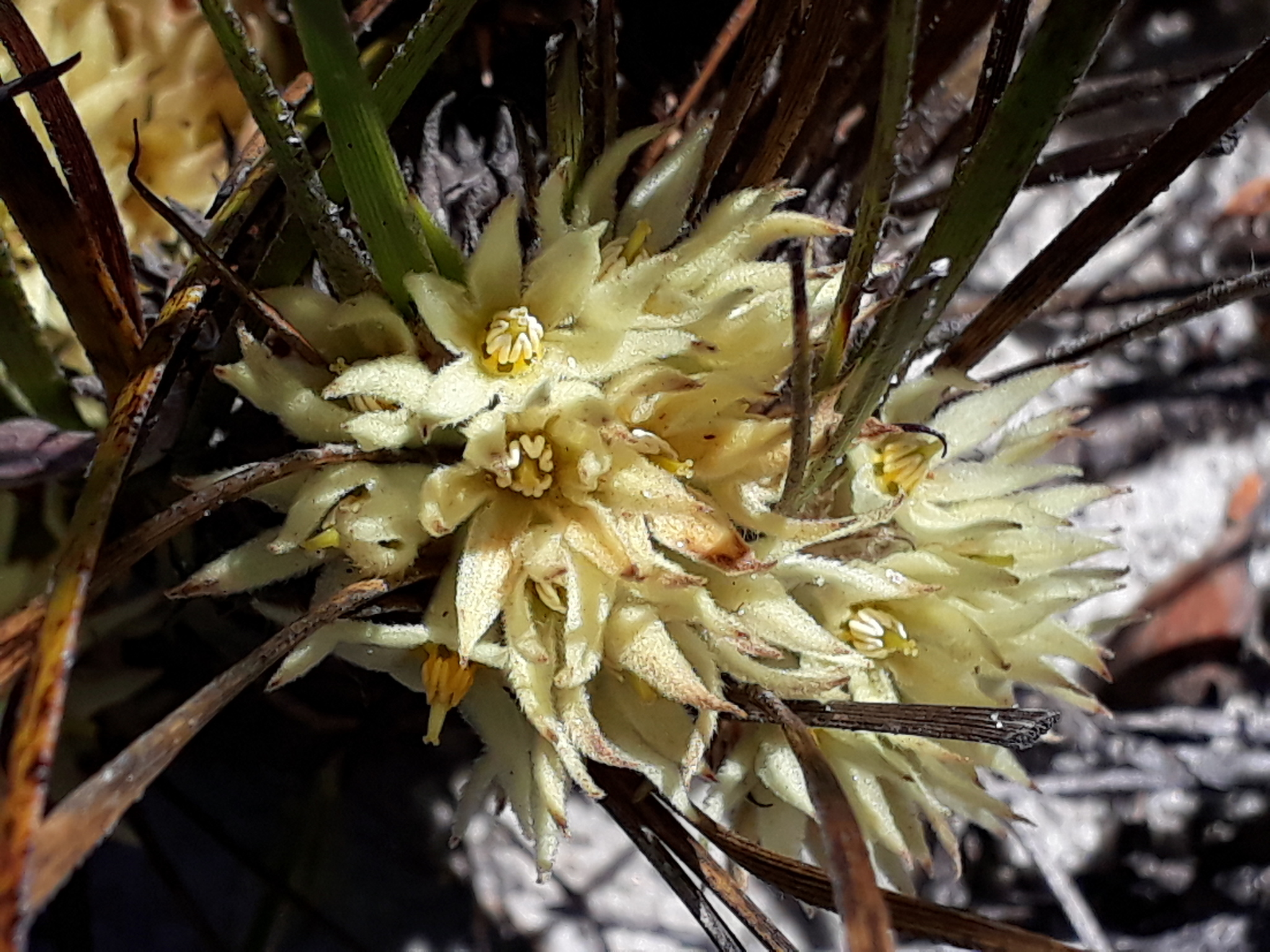

Scientific classification
- Kingdom: Plantae
- Clade: Tracheophytes
- Clade: Angiosperms
- Clade: Monocots
- Clade: Commelinids
- Order: Commelinales
- Family: Haemodoraceae
- Genus: Conostylis
- Species: C. breviscapa

Binomial name
- Conostylis breviscapa R.Br.
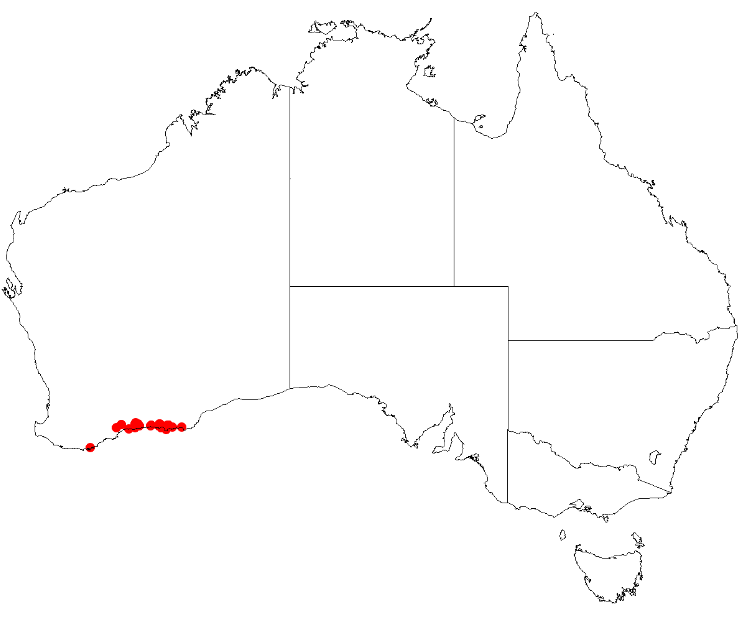
- Occurrence data from AVH

= Conostylis breviscapa =

Species of flowering plant

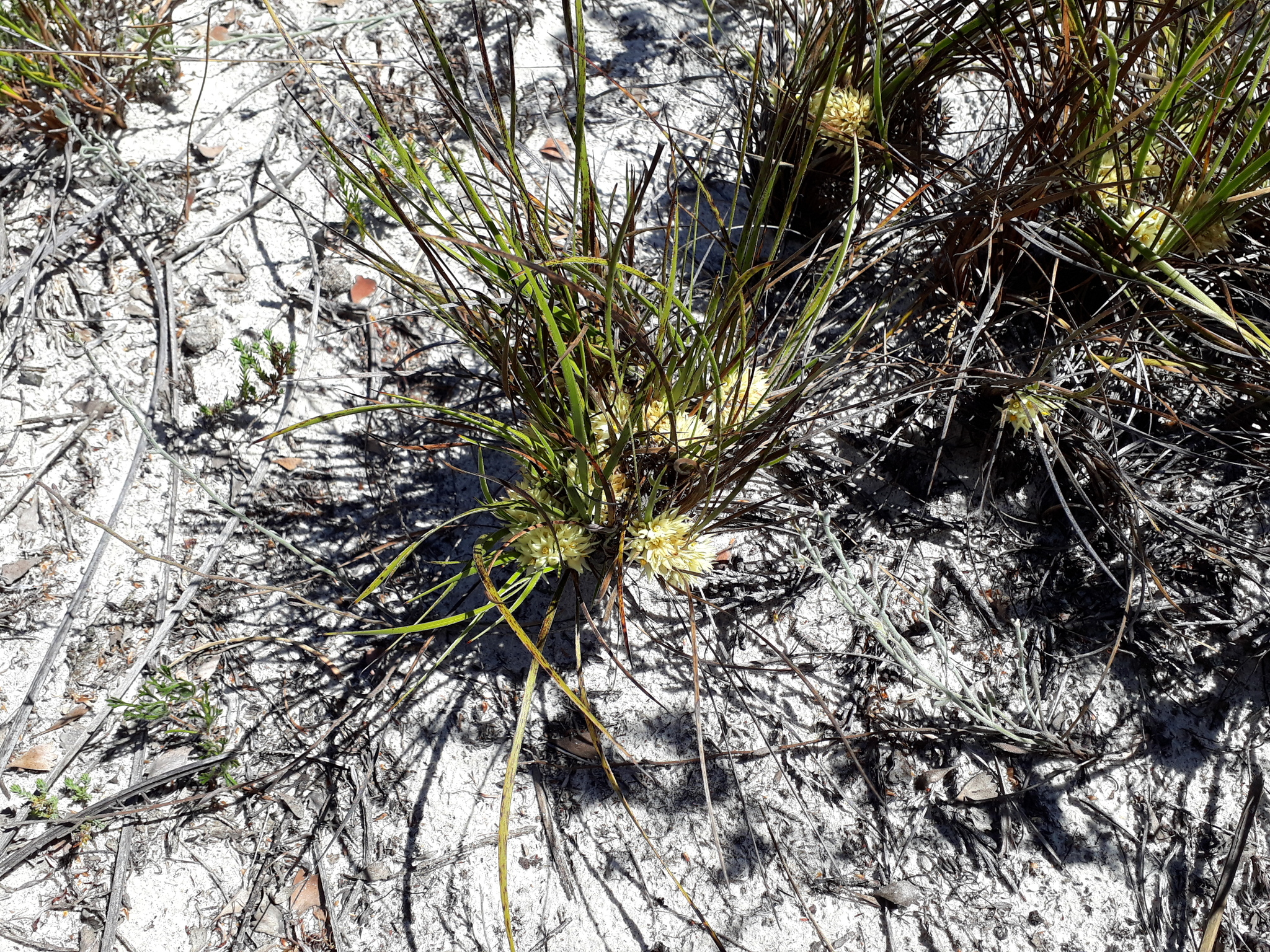
Habit near Esperance

Conostylis breviscapa is a rhizomatous, tufted perennial, grass-like plant or herb in the family Haemodoraceae and is endemic to the south-west of Western Australia. It has flat leaves and yellow, hairy, tubular flowers.

== Description ==
Conostylis breviscapa is a tufted, perennial, grass-like plant or herb or multi-stemmed plant forming clumps 11–30 cm (4.3–11.8 in) wide and up to 30 cm (12 in) high. The leaves are flat, typically 70–300 mm (2.8–11.8 in) long and 1–4 mm (0.039–0.157 in) wide with feather-like hairs on the edges. The flower stem is up to 65 mm (2.6 in) long, each flower on a pedicel 2.0–2.5 mm (0.079–0.098 in) long. The flowers are 9.5–11 mm (0.37–0.43 in) long and the perianth is yellow with six more or less equal tepals, the inner segments 4.5–7.5 mm (0.18–0.30 in) long. There are six stamens and the style is 4.0–4.8 mm (0.16–0.19 in) long. Flowering occurs from August to December or January.

== Taxonomy and naming ==
Conostylis breviscapa was first formally described in 1810 by Robert Brown in his Prodromus Florae Novae Hollandiae et Insulae Van Diemen. The specific epithet (breviscapa) means "short stalk".

== Distribution and habitat ==
This conostylis grows in mallee in sandy soil between Jerdacuttup and near Esperance in the Esperance Plains bioregion of southern Western Australia.
