= Conostylis neocymosa =

Scientific classification
- Kingdom: Plantae
- Clade: Tracheophytes
- Clade: Angiosperms
- Clade: Monocots
- Clade: Commelinids
- Order: Commelinales
- Family: Haemodoraceae
- Genus: Conostylis
- Species: C. neocymosa

Binomial name
- Conostylis neocymosa Hopper

Species of flowering plant

Conostylis neocymosa is a rhizomatous, tufted perennial, grass-like plant or herb in the family Haemodoraceae and is endemic to the south-west of Western Australia. It has flat, green leaves with bristles on the edges, and yellow, tubular flowers.

== Description ==
Conostylis neocymosa is a rhizomatous, tufted, perennial, grass-like plant or herb. It has flat, linear leaves 100–250 mm (3.9–9.8 in) long, 1.0–4.0 mm (0.039–0.157 in) wide and glabrous, apart from bristles on the edges, rarely more than 3 mm (0.12 in) apart. The flowers are borne groups of usually less than 10 on a flowering stem 50–150 mm (2.0–5.9 in) tall, each flower 8–15 mm (0.31–0.59 in) long on a pedicel 3–6 mm (0.12–0.24 in) long. The perianth is yellow with lobes 6–10 mm (0.24–0.39 in) long, the anthers 4–6 mm (0.16–0.24 in) long and the style 5–8 mm (0.20–0.31 in) long. Flowering occurs from July to September.

== Taxonomy and naming ==
Conostylis neocymosa was first formally described in 1980 by Stephen Hopper in the journal Botaniska Notiser, from specimens he collected near the Eneabba store in 1975. The specific epithet (neocymosa) means "new cymose", referring to the inflorescence.

== Distribution and habitat ==
This conostylis grows in deep sand in heath and mallee in disjunct populations near Northampton, Eneabba, Watheroo, Wubin and Merredin in the Avon Wheatbelt Geraldton Sandplains bioregions of south-western Western Australia.

== Conservation status ==
Conostylis neocymosa is listed as "not threatened" by the Western Australian Government Department of Biodiversity, Conservation and Attractions.
