= Conostylis bracteata =

Conservation status
- Priority Three — Poorly Known Taxa (DEC)

Scientific classification
- Kingdom: Plantae
- Clade: Tracheophytes
- Clade: Angiosperms
- Clade: Monocots
- Clade: Commelinids
- Order: Commelinales
- Family: Haemodoraceae
- Genus: Conostylis
- Species: C. bracteata

Binomial name
- Conostylis bracteata Lindl.
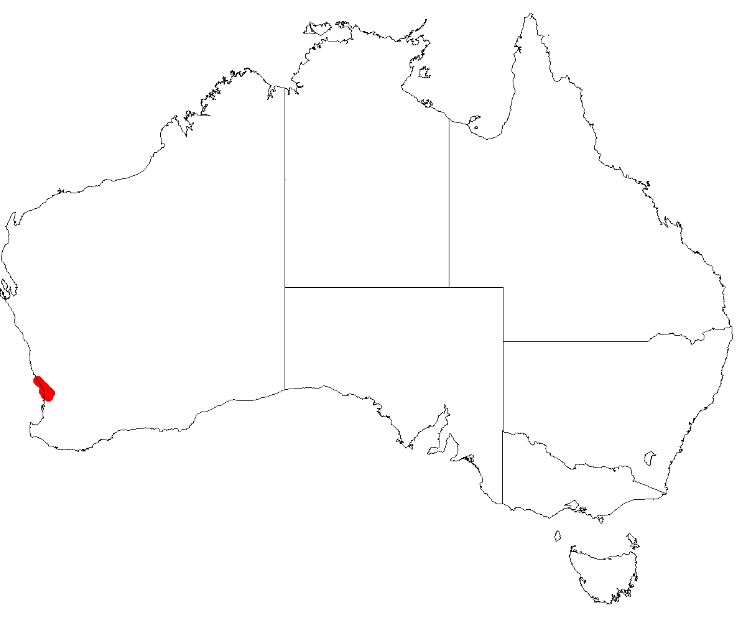
- Occurrence data from AVH

Species of flowering plant

Conostylis bracteata is a tufted perennial plant in the family Haemodoraceae and is endemic to the south-west of Western Australia. It is a rhizomatous, tufted, perennial, grass-like plant or herb with flat leaves and yellow, hairy, tubular flowers.

== Description ==
Conostylis bracteata is a perennial tufted or multi-stemmed plant forming clumps 30 cm (12 in) wide and up to 60 cm (24 in) high. The leaves are flat, arranged in flattened, broadly fan-shaped clusters, up to 170–400 mm (6.7–15.7 in) long and 4–7 mm (0.16–0.28 in) wide with dense, flexible, feather-like hairs on the edges. The flower stem is 320–500 mm (13–20 in) long, each flower on a pedicel 1.0–1.5 mm (0.039–0.059 in) long. The flowers are 10–15 mm (0.39–0.59 in) long and the perianth is golden yellow on the inside, with six more or less equal tepals. There are six stamens and the style is 6–10 mm (0.24–0.39 in) long. This species is similar to Conostylis aculeata subsp. cygnorum. Flowering occurs from August to September.

== Taxonomy and naming ==
Conostylis bracteata was first formally described in 1840 by John Lindley and the description was published in A Sketch of the Vegetation of the Swan River Colony. The specific epithet (bracteata) means "bracteate".

== Distribution and habitat ==
This conostylis is confined to the area between Perth and Lancelin, where it grows in sand in coastal heath and scrub in depressions between dunes close, to limestone.
