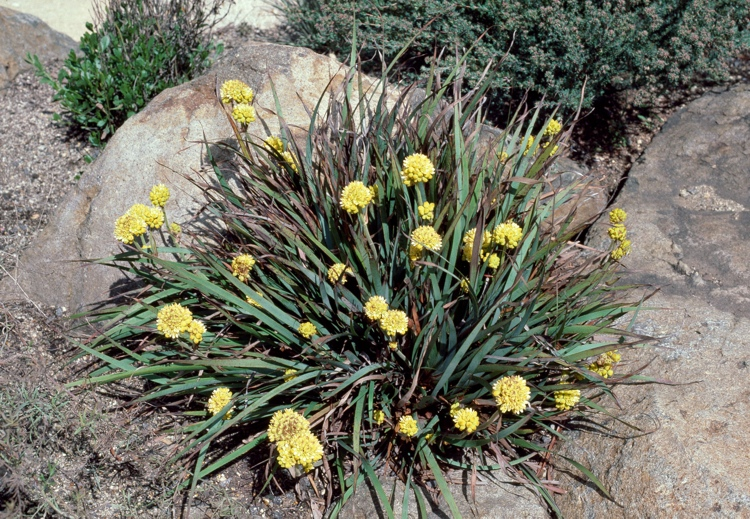
- In the Australian National Botanic Gardens

Scientific classification
- Kingdom: Plantae
- Clade: Tracheophytes
- Clade: Angiosperms
- Clade: Monocots
- Clade: Commelinids
- Order: Commelinales
- Family: Haemodoraceae
- Genus: Conostylis
- Species: C. robusta

Binomial name
- Conostylis robusta Hopper

= Conostylis robusta =

Species of flowering plant

Conostylis robusta is a rhizomatous, tufted, stoloniferous, perennial, grass-like plant or herb in the family Haemodoraceae and is endemic to the south-west of Western Australia. It has flat, green leaves with bristles on the edges, and heads of yellow flowers on a relatively long flowering stem.

== Description ==
Conostylis robusta is a rhizomatous, tufted, stoloniferous perennial grass-like plant or herb forming clumps 300 cm (120 in) wide and up to 60 cm (24 in) high. The leaves are flat, bluish-green and faintly glaucous, 80–340 mm (3.1–13.4 in) long and 2–12 mm (0.079–0.472 in) wide. The flower stem is green, 190–420 mm (7.5–16.5 in) long and usually longer than the leaves. The perianth is yellow and hairy, 5–12 mm (0.20–0.47 in) long with six more or less equal tepals and six stamens, the filaments 0.5–1 mm (0.020–0.039 in) long and the anthers 4.5–5.0 mm (0.18–0.20 in) long. Flowering occurs in August and September. This species is similar to C. aculeata.

== Taxonomy and naming ==
Conostylis robusta was first formally described in 1904 by Ludwig Diels in Botanische Jahrbücher für Systematik, Pflanzengeschichte und Pflanzengeographie, from specimens he collected near the Chapman River. The specific epithet (robusta) means "robust".

== Distribution and habitat ==
This species of conostylis grows in heath and scrub between the Mingenew-Walkaway area, Eradu and Kalbarri National Park in the Avon Wheatbelt and Geraldton Sandplains bioregions of south-western Western Australia.

== Conservation status ==
Conostylis robusta is listed as "not threatened" by the Government of Western Australia Department of Biodiversity, Conservation and Attractions.
