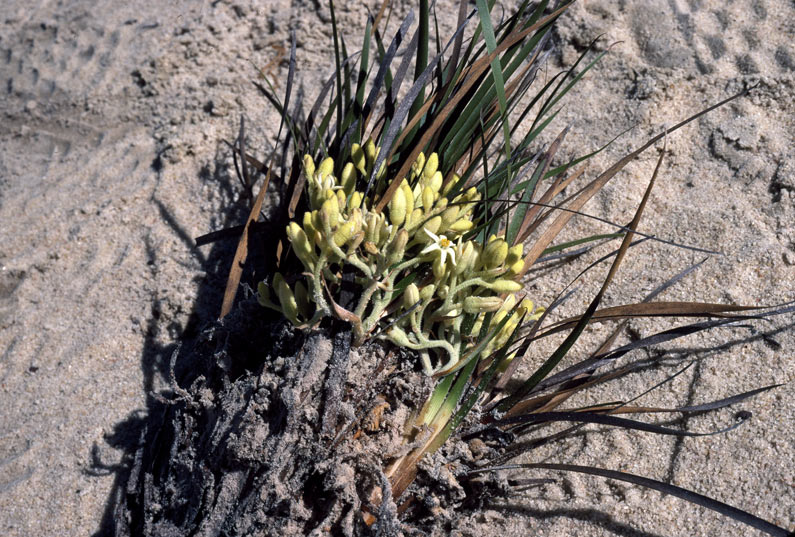
- Near Cape Arid National Park

Scientific classification
- Kingdom: Plantae
- Clade: Tracheophytes
- Clade: Angiosperms
- Clade: Monocots
- Clade: Commelinids
- Order: Commelinales
- Family: Haemodoraceae
- Genus: Conostylis
- Species: C. phathyrantha

Binomial name
- Conostylis phathyrantha Diels

= Conostylis phathyrantha =

Species of flowering plant

Conostylis phathyrantha is a rhizomatous, tufted perennial, grass-like plant or herb in the family Haemodoraceae and is endemic to the south of Western Australia. It has flat, glabrous leaves, and yellow, tubular flowers.

== Description ==
Conostylis phathyrantha is a rhizomatous, tufted, perennial, grass-like plant or herb with short stems. Its leaves are flat, curved, 130–300 mm (5.1–11.8 in) long, 3–6 mm (0.12–0.24 in) wide and glabrous, apart from pimply leaf margins. The flowers are borne in heads on a flowering stem 60–160 mm (2.4–6.3 in) long with a linear bract 10–50 mm (0.39–1.97 in) long and several flowers, each flower on a pedicel about 5 mm (0.20 in) long. The perianth is 12–15 mm (0.47–0.59 in) long and yellow, with lobes about 5 mm (0.20 in) long, the anthers about 2 mm (0.079 in) long. Flowering occurs from August to October.

== Taxonomy and naming ==
Conostylis phathyrantha was first formally described in 1904 by Ludwig Diels in Botanische Jahrbücher für Systematik, Pflanzengeschichte und Pflanzengeographie from specimens collected by Sarah Brooks near Israelite Bay. The specific epithet (phathyrantha) means "sun-flowered".

== Distribution and habitat ==
This conostylis grows in sand in heath and mallee heath between Starvation Boat Harbour and Israelite Bay in the Esperance Plains and Mallee bioregions of southern Western Australia.

== Conservation status ==
Conostylis phathyrantha is listed as "not threatened" by the Government of Western Australia Department of Biodiversity, Conservation and Attractions.
