= Conostylis tomentosa =

Scientific classification
- Kingdom: Plantae
- Clade: Tracheophytes
- Clade: Angiosperms
- Clade: Monocots
- Clade: Commelinids
- Order: Commelinales
- Family: Haemodoraceae
- Genus: Conostylis
- Species: C. tomentosa

Binomial name
- Conostylis tomentosa Hopper

Species of flowering plant

Conostylis tomentosa is a rhizomatous, tufted perennial, grass-like plant or herb in the family Haemodoraceae and is endemic to the south-west of Western Australia. It has flat leaves with bristles of hairs on the leaf margins, and golden yellow, tubular flowers.

== Description ==
Conostylis tomentosa is a rhizomatous, tufted, perennial grass-like plant or herb that typically grows to a height of up to 20 cm (7.9 in). It has flat leaves up to 200 mm (7.9 in) long, 1–4 mm (0.039–0.157 in) wide and densely hairy with greyish-white woolly hairs up to 1.5 mm (0.059 in) long. The flowers are 10–13 mm (0.39–0.51 in) long and borne on a flowering stem up to 300 mm (12 in) long, the flowers golden yellow with lobes 5–8 mm (0.20–0.31 in) long. The anthers are 3–4 mm (0.12–0.16 in) long and the style is 7–9 mm (0.28–0.35 in) long. Flowering occurs from July to August.

== Taxonomy and naming ==
Conostylis tomentosa was first formally described in 1987 by Stephen Hopper in the Flora of Australia, from specimens he collected 24.6 km (15.3 mi) north-north-west of the Eneabba - Three Springs turnoff along the Brand Highway in 1986. The specific epithet (tomentosa) means "tomentose".

== Distribution and habitat ==
This conostylis grows in sand in heath in between Eneabba and Arrowsmith in the Geraldton Sandplains bioregion of south-western Western Australia.

== Conservation status ==
Conostylis tomentosa is listed as "not threatened" by the Western Australian Government Department of Biodiversity, Conservation and Attractions.
