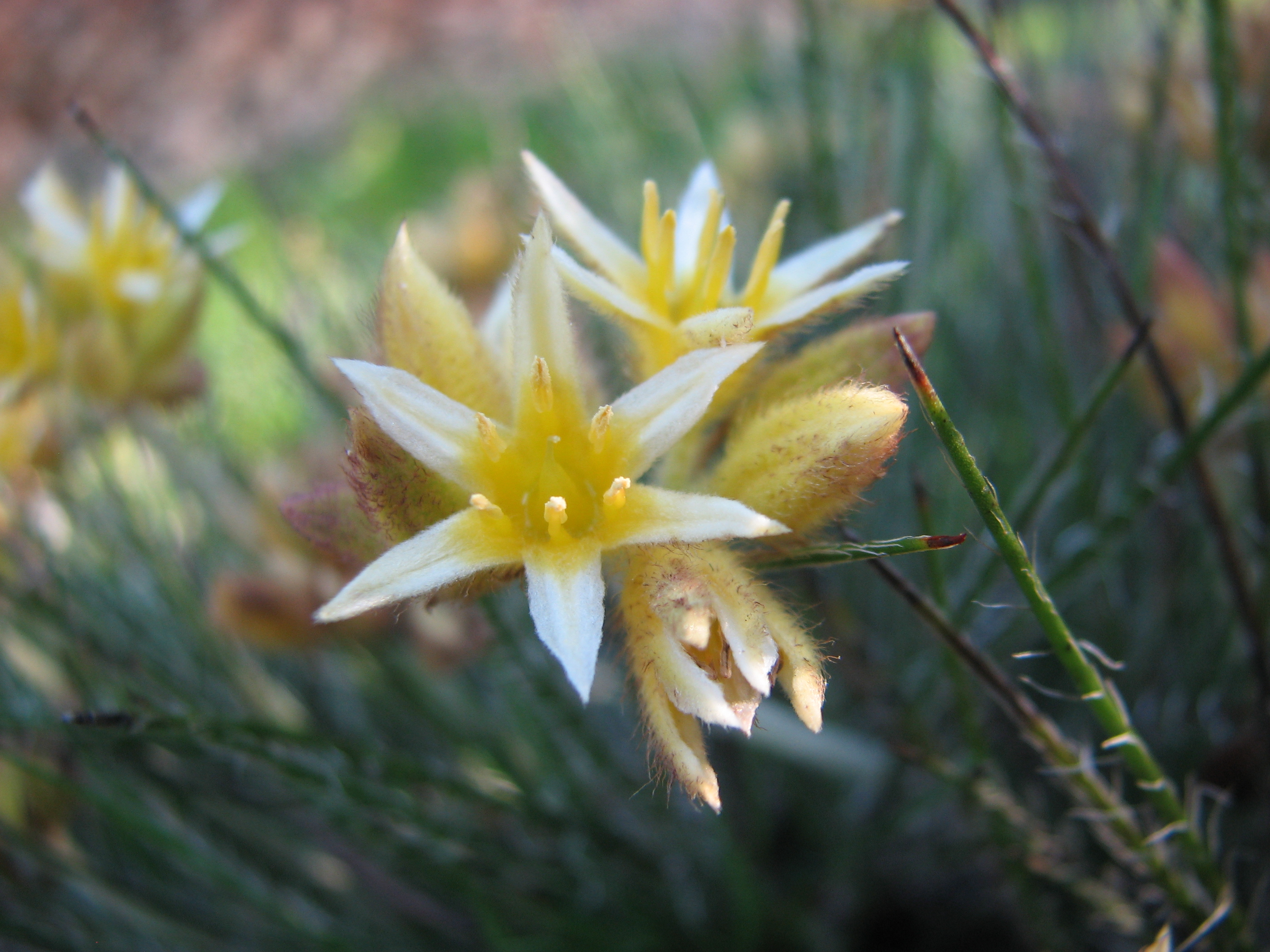
- Conostylis setigera

Scientific classification
- Kingdom: Plantae
- Clade: Tracheophytes
- Clade: Angiosperms
- Clade: Monocots
- Clade: Commelinids
- Order: Commelinales
- Family: Haemodoraceae
- Subfamily: Conostylidoideae
- Genus: Conostylis; R.Br.

Species
- See text

= Conostylis =

Genus of flowering plants

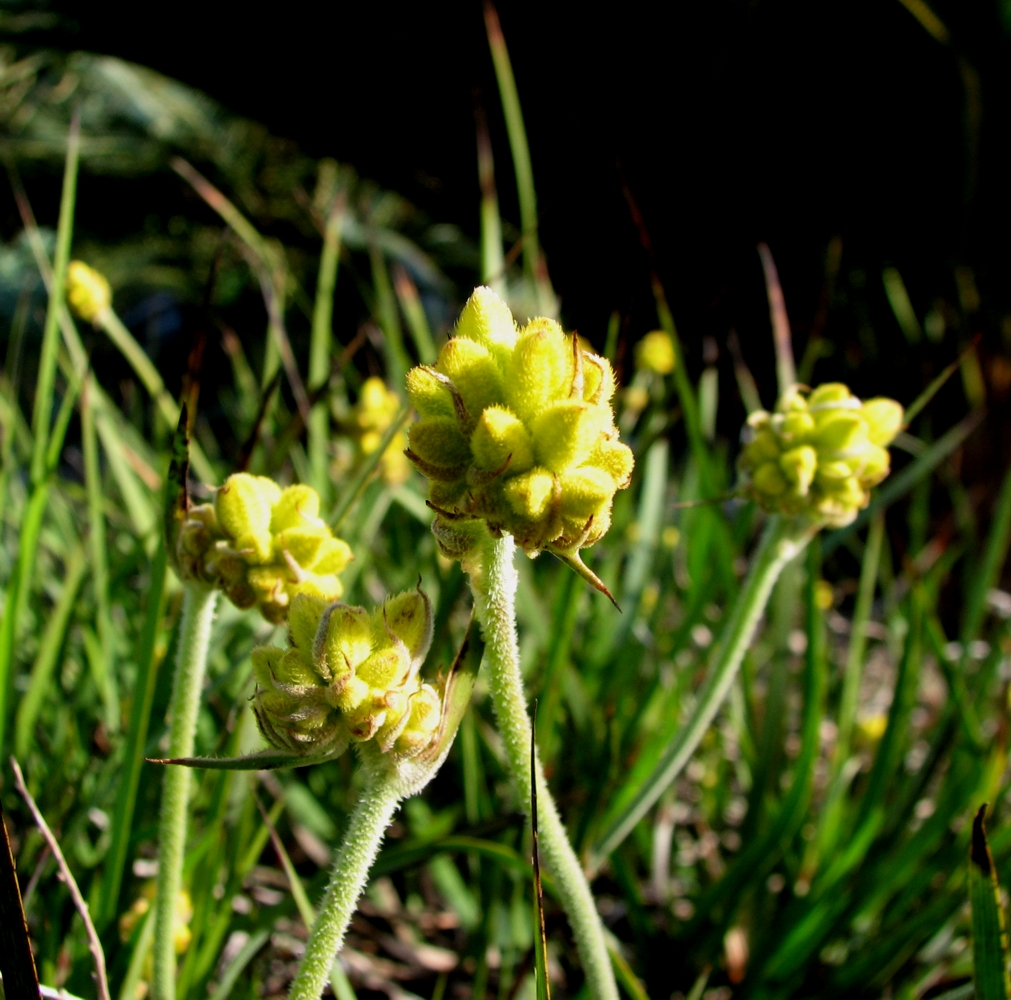
Conostylis aculeata

Conostylis is a genus of perennial herbs in the Haemodoraceae family, commonly known as cone flowers. All species are endemic to the south west of Western Australia.

== Description ==
They have leathery, strap-like leaves which arise from the base of the plant, sometimes from underground rhizomes. Flowers usually occur in clusters (sometimes singly) on stalks which emerge from the bases of the leaves. Individual flowers have a short stalk with six tepals which are either cream, yellow, orange or purple. The tepals join to form a short tube at the base with six similar stamens attached at the top of the tube.

== Taxonomy ==
The genus is the most speciose of the Haemodoraceae family, and one of six genera which only occur in the Southwest Australia bioregion; they are closely related to the well-known kangaroo paws, species of Anigozanthos and Macropidia. Conostylis was described by Robert Brown, published in his Prodromus of Australian flora in 1810. No type species was provided by the author. The genus name Conostylis is derived from Ancient Greek terms for 'cone' and 'column, style', a reference to the conical shape of the style's tip.

=== Species list ===
The following is a list of Conostylis species accepted by the Australian Plant Census as of October 2023:

- Conostylis aculeata R.Br. – prickly conostylis
- Conostylis albescens Hopper
- Conostylis androstemma F.Muell. – trumpets
- Conostylis angustifolia Hopper
- Conostylis argentea (J.W.Green) Hopper
- Conostylis aurea Lindl. – golden conostylis
- Conostylis bealiana F.Muell.
- Conostylis bracteata Lindl.
- Conostylis breviscapa R.Br.
- Conostylis candicans Endl. – grey cottonhead
- Conostylis canteriata Hopper
- Conostylis caricina Lindl.
- Conostylis crassinerva J.W.Green
- Conostylis deplexa J.W.Green
- Conostylis dielsii W.Fitzg.
- Conostylis drummondii Benth. – Drummond's conostylis
- Conostylis festucacea Endl.
- Conostylis hiemalis Hopper
- Conostylis juncea Endl.
- Conostylis latens Hopper
- Conostylis laxiflora Benth.
- Conostylis lepidospermoides Hopper
- Conostylis micrantha Hopper – small-flowered conostylis
- Conostylis misera Endl. – grass conostylis
- Conostylis neocymosa Hopper
- Conostylis pauciflora Hopper – Dawesville conostylis
- Conostylis petrophiloides F.Muell. ex Benth.
- Conostylis phathyrantha Diels
- Conostylis prolifera Benth. – mat cottonheads
- Conostylis pusilla Endl.
- Conostylis resinosa Hopper
- Conostylis robusta Diels
- Conostylis rogeri Hopper
- Conostylis seminuda Hopper
- Conostylis seorsiflora F.Muell.
- Conostylis serrulata R.Br.
- Conostylis setigera R.Br. – bristly cottonhead
- Conostylis setosa Lindl. – white cottonhead
- Conostylis stylidioides F.Muell.
- Conostylis teretifolia J.W.Green
- Conostylis teretiuscula F.Muell.
- Conostylis tomentosa Hopper
- Conostylis vaginata Endl. – sheath conostylis
- Conostylis villosa Benth.
- Conostylis wonganensis Hopper – Wongan conostylis
