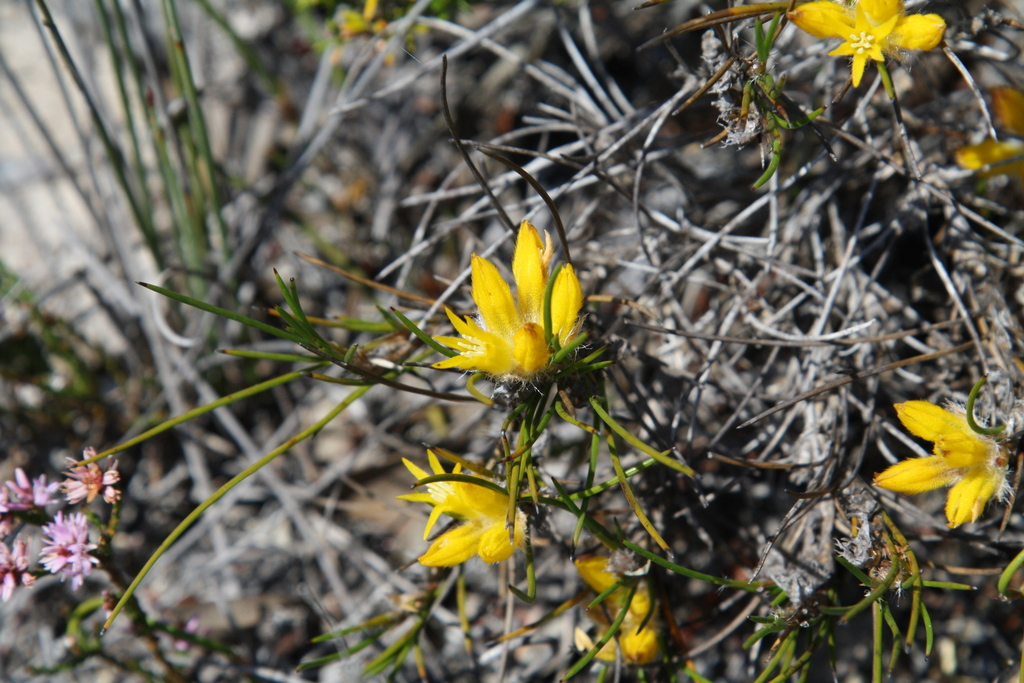
- Near Jerdacuttup

Scientific classification
- Kingdom: Plantae
- Clade: Tracheophytes
- Clade: Angiosperms
- Clade: Monocots
- Clade: Commelinids
- Order: Commelinales
- Family: Haemodoraceae
- Genus: Conostylis
- Species: C. vaginata

Binomial name
- Conostylis vaginata Endl.

= Conostylis vaginata =

Species of flowering plant

Conostylis vaginata, commonly known as sheath conostylis, is a rhizomatous, tufted perennial, grass-like plant or herb in the family Haemodoraceae, and is endemic to the south of Western Australia. It has much-branched stems, grass-like leaves and yellow flowers arranged at the base of the leaves.

== Description ==
Conostylis vaginata is a rhizomatous, tufted, perennial grass-like plant or herb. Its leaves are flattened elliptical, 70–100 mm (2.8–3.9 in) long and 0.7–1 mm (0.028–0.039 in) wide and glabrous. The flowers are sessile and borne in pairs at the base of the leaves, each flower 10–13 mm (0.39–0.51 in) long with a bract 3.0–3.5 mm (0.12–0.14 in) long at the base. The perianth is yellow with six more or less equal tepals and six stamens, the anthers 0.4–2 mm (0.016–0.079 in) long and the style 7–10 mm (0.28–0.39 in) long. Flowering occurs in September or October.

== Taxonomy and naming ==
Conostylis vaginata was first formally described in 1846 by Stephan Endlicher in Lehmann's Plantae Preissianae. The specific epithet (vaginata) means "sheathed", referring to the bracts.

== Distribution and habitat ==
This species of conostylis grows in sand, loam or clay on sand dunes and in winter-wet areas in the Esperance Plains, Jarrah Forest and Mallee bioregions of southern Western Australia.

== Conservation status ==
Conostylis vaginata is listed as "not threatened" by the Western Australian Government Department of Biodiversity, Conservation and Attractions.
