= Conostylis canteriata =

Scientific classification
- Kingdom: Plantae
- Clade: Tracheophytes
- Clade: Angiosperms
- Clade: Monocots
- Clade: Commelinids
- Order: Commelinales
- Family: Haemodoraceae
- Genus: Conostylis
- Species: C. canteriata

Binomial name
- Conostylis canteriata Hopper
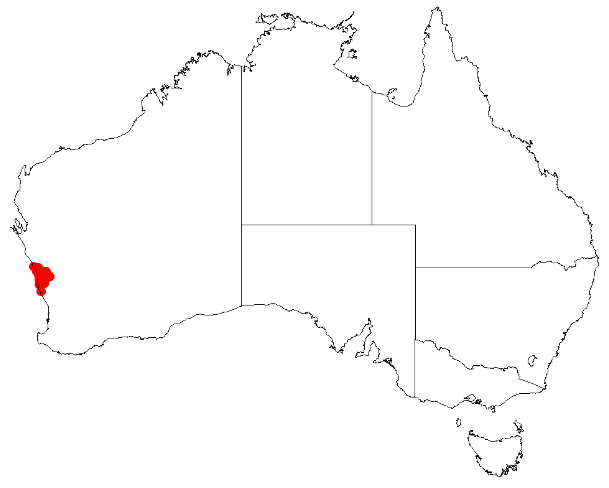
- Occurrence data from AVH

Species of flowering plant

Conostylis canteriata is a rhizomatous, tufted perennial, grass-like plant or herb in the family Haemodoraceae and is endemic to the south-west of Western Australia. It has stilted roots, flat leaves, and pale lemon-yellow tubular flowers.

== Description ==
Conostylis canteriata is a rhizomatous, tufted, perennial, grass-like plant or herb 10–20 cm (3.9–7.9 in) wide, and has stilted roots descending from the stem up to 5 cm (2.0 in) above the soil. The stems are 10–40 mm (0.39–1.57 in) long, the leaves 10–20 mm (0.39–0.79 in) long and 1–3 mm (0.039–0.118 in) wide. The flowers are on a spherical, many-flowered head on a flowering stalk 150–250 mm (5.9–9.8 in) long with leafy, glabrous bracts at the base. The perianth is pale lemon-yellow and 5.5–11 mm (0.22–0.43 in) long with six more or less equal tepals, the inner segments 4.0–7.5 mm (0.16–0.30 in) long. There are six stamens and the style is 4.0–8.0 mm (0.16–0.31 in) long. Flowering occurs from May to August.

== Taxonomy and naming ==
Conostylis canteriata was first formally described in 1987 by Stephen Hopper in the Flora of Australia. The specific epithet (canteriata) means "supported on a prop", referring to the roots.

== Distribution and habitat ==
This conostylis usually grows in disturbed habitats in low heath mainly from Green Head to the Irwin River in the Avon Wheatbelt, Geraldton Sandplains and Swan Coastal Plain bioregions of south-western Western Australia.
