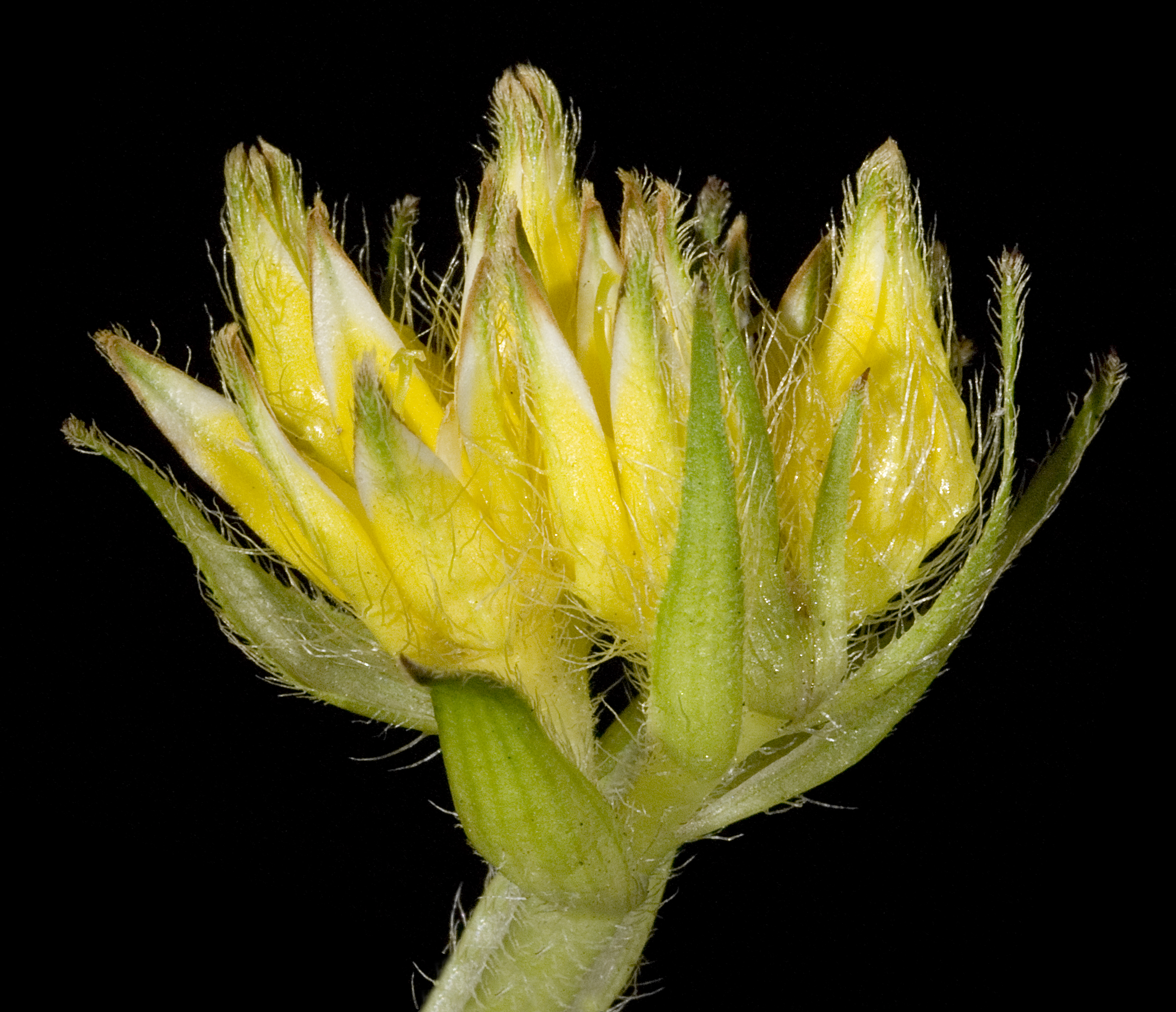

Scientific classification
- Kingdom: Plantae
- Clade: Tracheophytes
- Clade: Angiosperms
- Clade: Monocots
- Clade: Commelinids
- Order: Commelinales
- Family: Haemodoraceae
- Genus: Conostylis
- Species: C. juncea

Binomial name
- Conostylis juncea Endl.
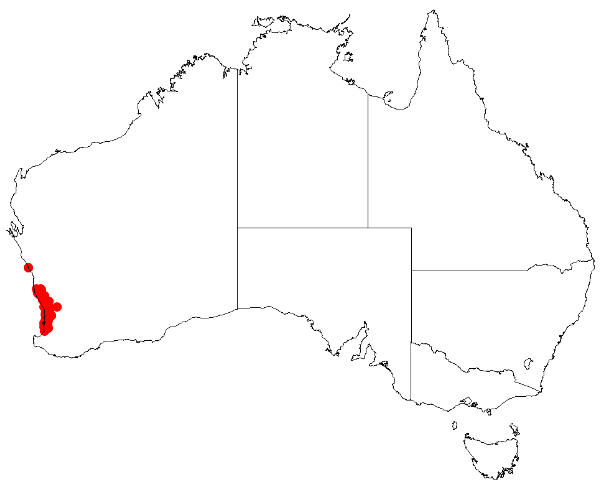
- Occurrence data from AVH

= Conostylis juncea =

Species of flowering plant

Conostylis juncea is a rhizomatous, tufted perennial, grass-like plant or herb in the family Haemodoraceae, and is endemic to the south-west of Western Australia. It has cylindrical or flat leaves and yellow flowers on a short flowering stem.

== Description ==
Conostylis juncea is a rhizomatous, proliferous perennial with tufts up to 20 cm (7.9 in) in diameter. Its leaves are more or less round in cross-section or almost flat, 100–400 mm (3.9–15.7 in) long and 1–4 mm (0.039–0.157 in) wide and usually glabrous with prominent veins. The flowers borne just above the ground on a short flowering stalk with broadly egg-shaped or lance-shaped green bracts at the base. The perianth is hairy, yellow or greenish-yellow, 12–20 mm (0.47–0.79 in) long with lobes 9–12.5 mm (0.35–0.49 in) long. The anthers are 3.5–6 mm (0.14–0.24 in) long. Flowering occurs from July to September.

== Taxonomy and naming ==
Conostylis juncea was first formally described in 1839 by Stephan Endlicher in Novarum Stirpium Decades. The specific epithet (juncea) means "rush-like".

== Distribution and habitat ==
This species of conostylis grows in sand in open woodland and heath in near-coastal areas between Jurien Bay and Australind in the Avon Wheatbelt, Geraldton Sandplains, Jarrah Forest and Swan Coastal Plain bioregions of south-western Western Australia.

== Conservation status ==
Conostylis juncea is listed as "not threatened" by the Western Australian Government Department of Biodiversity, Conservation and Attractions.
