= Conostylis hiemalis =

Scientific classification
- Kingdom: Plantae
- Clade: Tracheophytes
- Clade: Angiosperms
- Clade: Monocots
- Clade: Commelinids
- Order: Commelinales
- Family: Haemodoraceae
- Genus: Conostylis
- Species: C. hiemalis

Binomial name
- Conostylis hiemalis Hopper
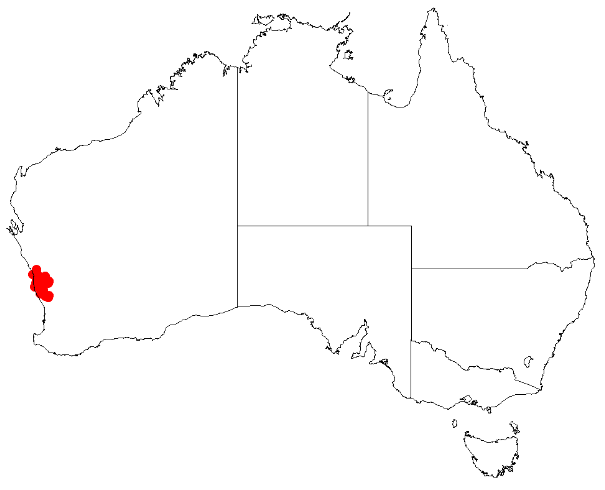
- Occurrence data from AVH

Species of flowering plant

Conostylis hiemalis is a rhizomatous, tufted perennial, grass-like plant or herb in the family Haemodoraceae and is endemic to the south-west of Western Australia. It has flat leaves, usually with woolly grey hairs at the base, and pale yellow to cream-coloured, tubular flowers.

== Description ==
Conostylis hiemalis is a rhizomatous, tufted, perennial, grass-like plant or herb. It has flat leaves 100–180 mm (3.9–7.1 in) long and 1.5–4 mm (0.059–0.157 in) wide, sometimes with grey woolly hairs at the base, and with 2 rows on hairs on the edges of the leaves. The flower stems are 70–400 mm (2.8–15.7 in) long and about the same length as the leaves. The perianth is 6.5–12 mm (0.26–0.47 in) long with pale yellow to cream-coloured lobes 3.5–5.5 mm (0.14–0.22 in) long. The anthers are 1.5–4 mm (0.059–0.157 in) long and the style 6.5–9.5 mm (0.26–0.37 in) long. Flowering occurs from June to August.

== Taxonomy and naming ==
Conostylis hiemalis was first formally described in 1987 by Stephen Hopper in the Flora of Australia from specimens he collected south-east of Dongara in 1975. The specific epithet (hiemalis) means "wintry", referring to the flowering time.

== Distribution and habitat ==
This conostylis grows in sand or sandy soils often in winter-wet areas between Dandaragan and the Irwin River in the Avon Wheatbelt, Geraldton Sandplains and Swan Coastal Plain bioregions of south-western Western Australia.
