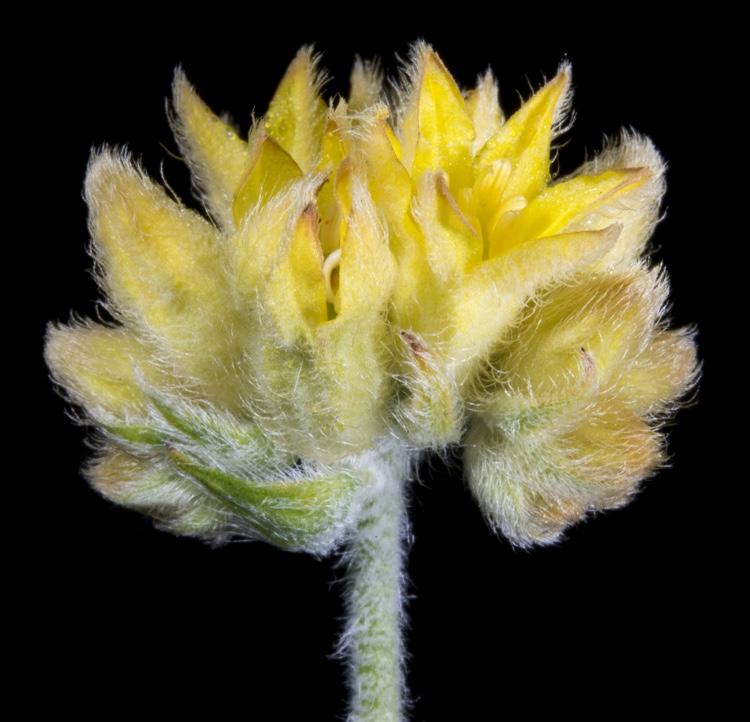
- Near the Greenough River

Scientific classification
- Kingdom: Plantae
- Clade: Tracheophytes
- Clade: Angiosperms
- Clade: Monocots
- Clade: Commelinids
- Order: Commelinales
- Family: Haemodoraceae
- Genus: Conostylis
- Species: C. stylidioides

Binomial name
- Conostylis stylidioides F.Muell.

= Conostylis stylidioides =

Species of flowering plant

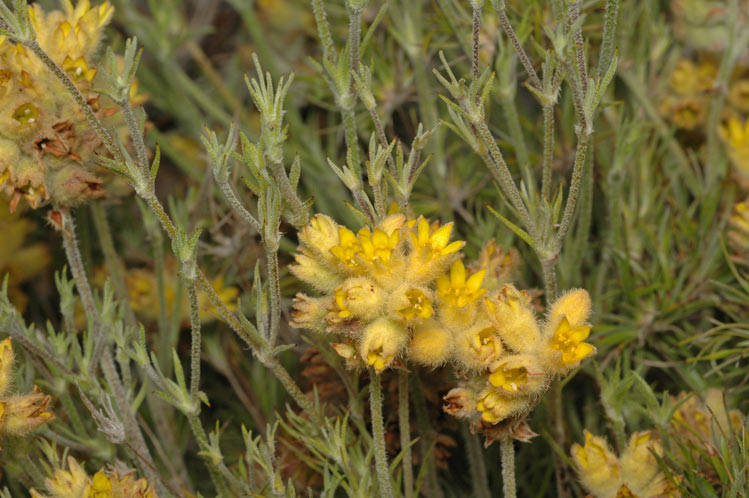
Habit in Kings Park, Western Australia

Conostylis stylidioides is a rhizomatous, stoloniferous, perennial, grass-like plant or herb in the family Haemodoraceae and is endemic to the west of Western Australia. It has flat leaves and yellow, tube-shaped flowers.

== Description ==
Conostylis stylidioides is a rhizomatous, much-branched, perennial grass-like plant or herb with stolons up to 20 cm (7.9 in) long. It has flat leaves usually 15–25 mm (0.59–0.98 in) long but sometimes up to 50 mm (2.0 in) long, 0.4–0.9 mm (0.016–0.035 in) wide and covered with woolly grey hairs when young. The flowers are 7.5–13 mm (0.30–0.51 in) long and borne singly on a flowering stem 30–240 mm (1.2–9.4 in) long, the flowers yellow with lobes 2.5–60 mm (0.098–2.362 in) long. The anthers are 1.0–2.5 mm (0.039–0.098 in) long and the style is 6.5–9 mm (0.26–0.35 in) long. Flowering occurs in August and September.

== Taxonomy and naming ==
Conostylis stylidioides was first formally described in 1873 by Ferdinand von Mueller in his Fragmenta phytographiae Australiae, from specimens collected by George Maxwell near the Murchison River. The specific epithet (stylidioides) means "Stylidium-like".

== Distribution and habitat ==
This species of conostylis grows in sandy soil in mallee scrub along the coast from Dirk Hartog Island to Geraldton and inland as far as Yuna in the Avon Wheatbelt, Geraldton Sandplains, Yalgoo bioregions of western Western Australia.

== Conservation status ==
Conostylis stylidioides is listed as "not threatened" by the Western Australian Government Department of Biodiversity, Conservation and Attractions.
