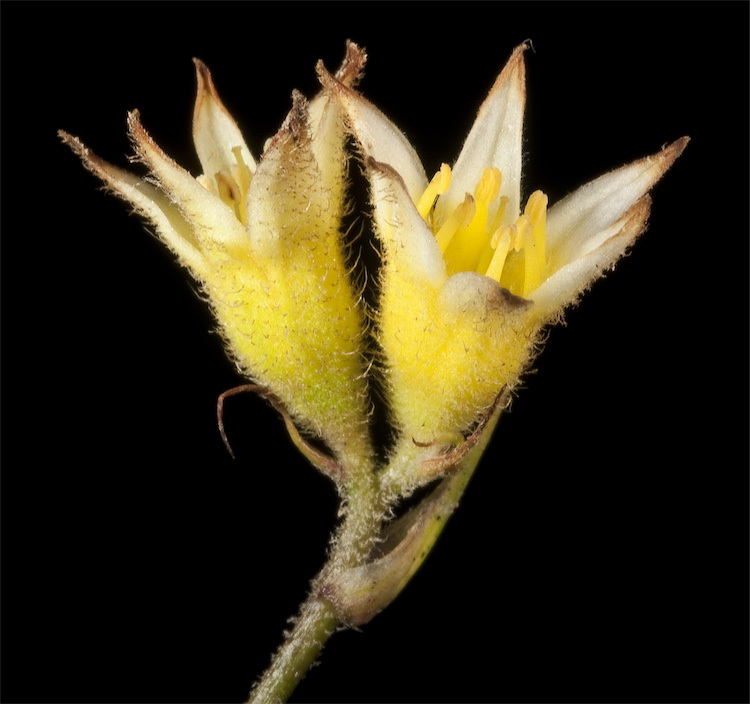
- Near Brookton

Scientific classification
- Kingdom: Plantae
- Clade: Tracheophytes
- Clade: Angiosperms
- Clade: Monocots
- Clade: Commelinids
- Order: Commelinales
- Family: Haemodoraceae
- Genus: Conostylis
- Species: C. prolifera

Binomial name
- Conostylis prolifera Benth.

Synonyms
- Conostylis racemosa Benth.; Conostylis stylidioides auct. non F.Muell.

= Conostylis prolifera =

Species of flowering plant

Conostylis prolifera, commonly known as mat cottonheads, is a rhizomatous, tufted, stoloniferous, perennial, grass-like plant or herb in the family Haemodoraceae and is endemic to the south-west of Western Australia. It has flat, glabrous leaves, and yellow and cream-coloured, tubular flowers.

== Description ==
Conostylis prolifera is a rhizomatous, tufted, perennial, grass-like plant or herb with small tufts, a few plants connected to each other by a network of stolons 4–20 cm (1.6–7.9 in) long. Its leaves are flat, glabrous, 10–60 mm (0.39–2.36 in) long, 0.5–1.5 mm (0.020–0.059 in) wide, sometimes with minute bristles on the edges. The flowers are borne in heads on a flowering stem 10–150 mm (0.39–5.91 in) long with a small, leaf-like bract 5–17 mm (0.20–0.67 in) long. The perianth is 7–13 mm (0.28–0.51 in) long and yellow, cream-coloured on the inside, with lobes 4.5–8 mm (0.18–0.31 in) long. The anthers are 0.4–1.1 mm (0.016–0.043 in) long and the style is 6.0–9.5 mm (0.24–0.37 in) long. Flowering occurs from August to October.

== Taxonomy and naming ==
Conostylis prolifera was first formally described in 1873 by George Bentham in Flora Australiensis. The specific epithet (prolifera) means "proliferating".

== Distribution and habitat ==
This conostylis grows in loam and sand in winter-wet flats between the lower Murchison River, Beverley, Tammin and Wickepin in the Avon Wheatbelt, Geraldton Sandplains, Jarrah Forest, Swan Coastal Plain and Yalgoo bioregions of south-western Western Australia.

== Conservation status ==
Conostylis prolifera is listed as "not threatened" by the Government of Western Australia Department of Biodiversity, Conservation and Attractions.
