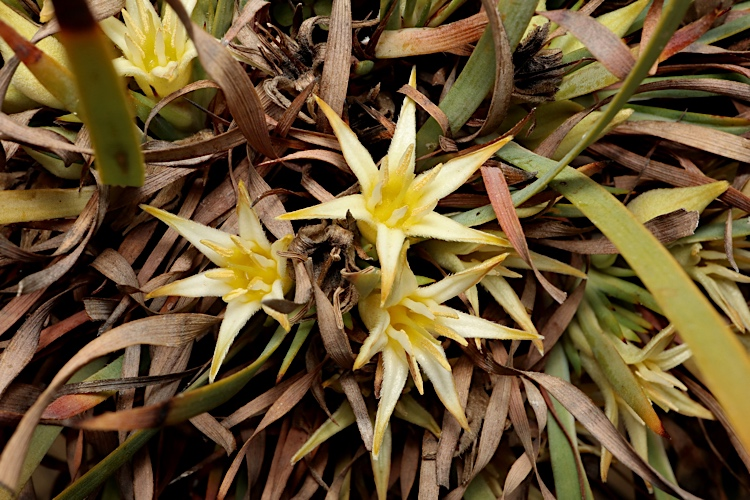
- In the Australian National Botanic Gardens

Conservation status
- Endangered (EPBC Act)

Scientific classification
- Kingdom: Plantae
- Clade: Tracheophytes
- Clade: Angiosperms
- Clade: Monocots
- Clade: Commelinids
- Order: Commelinales
- Family: Haemodoraceae
- Genus: Conostylis
- Species: C. misera

Binomial name
- Conostylis misera Endl.

= Conostylis misera =

Species of flowering plant

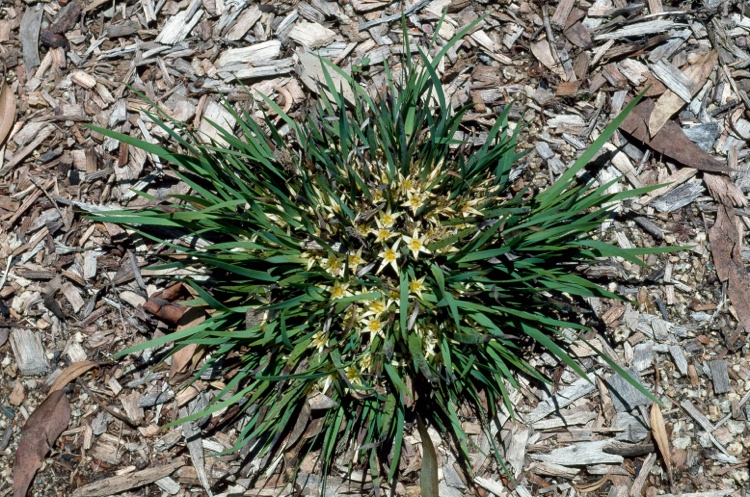
Habit

Conostylis misera, commonly known as grass conostylis, is a prostrate, rhizomatous, tufted perennial, grass-like plant or herb in the family Haemodoraceae, and is endemic to the south-west of Western Australia. It has flat leaves and bright yellow flowers usually arranged singly on a short flowering stem.

== Description ==
Conostylis misera is a prostrate, rhizomatous, proliferous perennial that typically grows to a height of 5–18 cm (2.0–7.1 in) high. Its leaves are flat, 50–180 mm (2.0–7.1 in) long and 2–6 mm (0.079–0.236 in) wide and often remain attached to the plant, becoming blackened and twisted. The flowers are borne singly on a flowering stalk 4–20 cm (1.6–7.9 in) long with 2 or 3 glabrous brown bracts. The perianth is bright yellow, 12–19 mm (0.47–0.75 in) long with lobes 10.5–18 mm (0.41–0.71 in) long. The anthers are 4.5–7.0 mm (0.18–0.28 in) long and the style is 8–12 mm (0.31–0.47 in) long. Flowering occurs in October and November.

== Taxonomy and naming ==
Conostylis misera was first formally described in 1846 by Stephan Endlicher in Lehmann's Plantae Preissianae. The specific epithet (misera) means "wretched".

== Distribution and habitat ==
This species of conostylis grows in sandy loam in winter-west flats from Mount Barker and the Porongurups to the Stirling Range in the Esperance Plains and Jarrah Forest bioregions of south-western Western Australia.

== Conservation status ==
Conostylis misera is listed as "endangered" under the Australian Government Environment Protection and Biodiversity Conservation Act 1999 and as "Threatened" by the Western Australian Government Department of Biodiversity, Conservation and Attractions, meaning that it is in danger of extinction.
