= Conostylis angustifolia =

Scientific classification
- Kingdom: Plantae
- Clade: Tracheophytes
- Clade: Angiosperms
- Clade: Monocots
- Clade: Commelinids
- Order: Commelinales
- Family: Haemodoraceae
- Genus: Conostylis
- Species: C. angustifolia

Binomial name
- Conostylis angustifolia Hopper
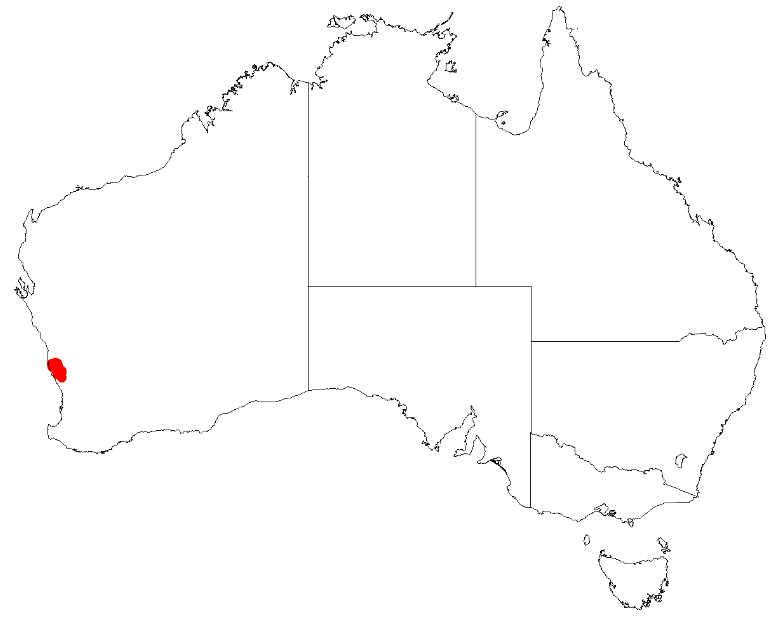
- Occurrence data from AVH

Species of flowering plant

Conostylis angustifolia is a rhizomatous, tufted perennial plant species in the family Haemodoraceae, endemic to the south-west of Western Australia. In September and October it produces yellow flowers in the species' native range.

== Description ==
The leaves are flat, a dull brick red, and 12 to 40 cm long and 1 to 3.5 mm wide. The leaf base is sometimes densely matted with woolly hairs, but these often abrade to make the leaf smooth. The leaf margins have bristles/hairs which are 0 to 2 mm long, and there are some small side branches at the base. The scape is hairy and 15 to 40 cm long, usually longer than the leaves. The inflorescence consists of several flowers, and is subtended by a bract 22 to 24 mm long. The flowers are 10–19 mm long and sessile. The hairy, radially symmetric perianth is yellow, and has six roughly equal tepals. There are six stamens all at the same level. The filaments are 1 are 1.2 mm long, with anthers 4 to 4.5 mm long. The style is 8–10 mm long and it flowers in September.

The perianth is 11 to 17 mm long and the tube is a golden yellow. The lobes are 5–9 mm long, and are pale yellow with the margins at the apex being white or sometimes maroon. The anthers are 2.3–5 mm long and have no appendages.

There are at least two conflicts in the descriptions between the two sources used: the first in anther length; the second (a major conflict) in anther appendages: Florabase, stating that the anthers have appendages, while in Flora of Australia online "anthers lacking appendage" is a feature which is diagnostic for the species: "The long narrow leaves, the long scapes with large flowers, and anthers lacking appendages are diagnostic of the species."

== Distribution ==
It occurs in the IBRA bioregions of the Geraldton Sandplains and the Swan Coastal Plain in the South-west Botanical Province.

== Taxonomy ==
It was first described in 1987 by Stephen Hopper as Conostylis angustifolia. The specific epithet, angustifolium, derives from the Latin, angustus ("narrow") and folium ("leaf") giving "narrow-leaved".
