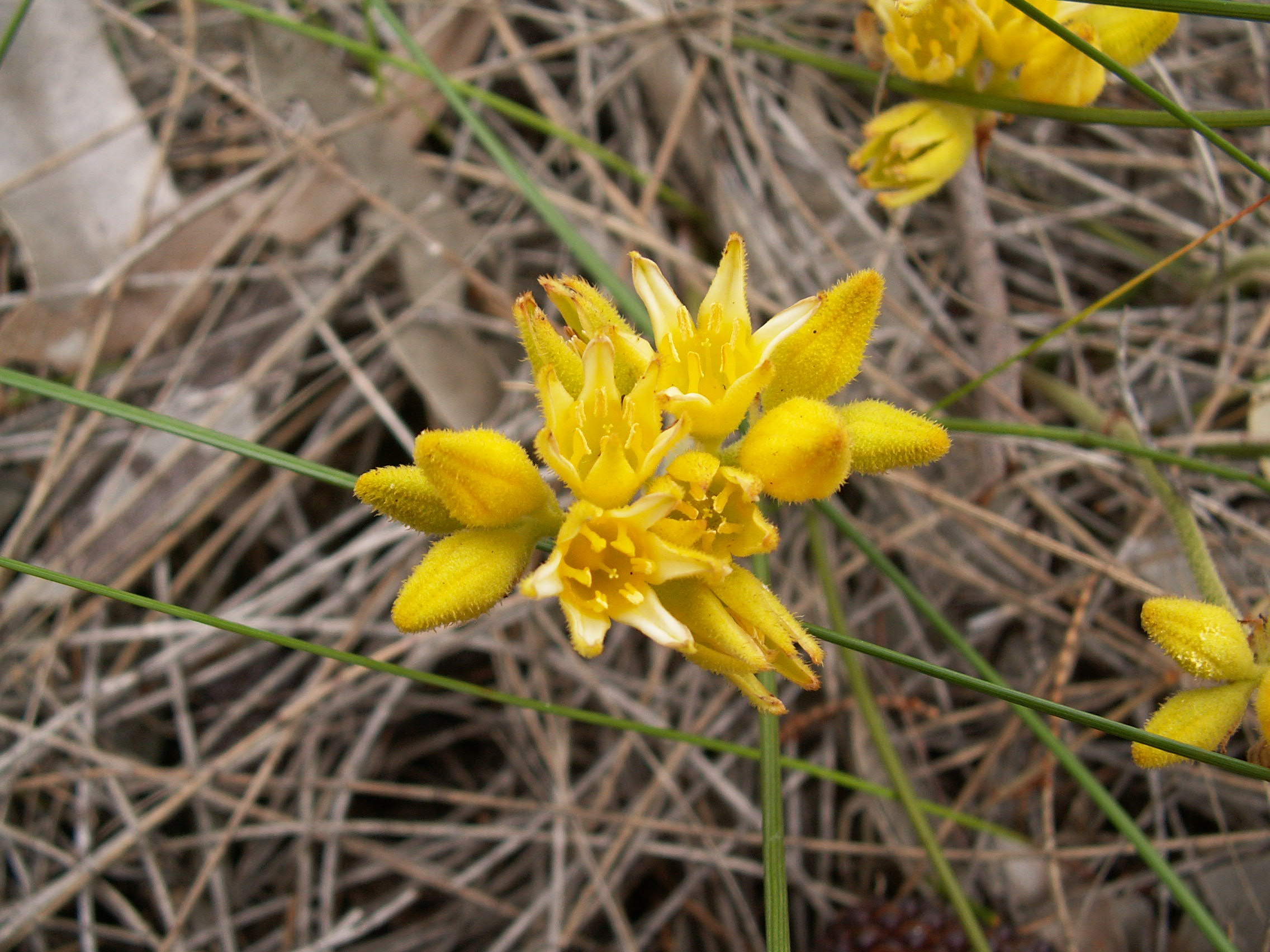
- C. aurea near Jurien Bay, Western Australia

Scientific classification
- Kingdom: Plantae
- Clade: Tracheophytes
- Clade: Angiosperms
- Clade: Monocots
- Clade: Commelinids
- Order: Commelinales
- Family: Haemodoraceae
- Genus: Conostylis
- Species: C. aurea

Binomial name
- Conostylis aurea Lindl.
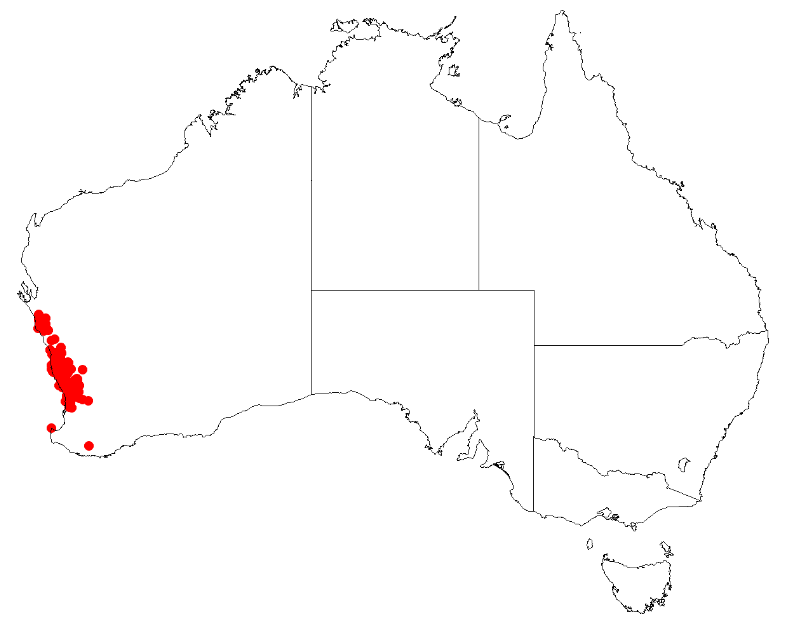
- Occurrence data from AVH

Synonyms
- Conostylis aurea Lindl. var. aurea; Conostylis sulphurea Endl.

= Conostylis aurea =

Golden conostylis

Species of flowering plant

Conostylis aurea, commonly known as golden conostylis, is a plant in the bloodwort family Haemodoraceae. It is endemic to the south-west of Western Australia.

== Description ==
Conostylis aurea is a rhizomatous, tufted perennial, grass-like herb. It grows to a height of 0.15–0.4 metres (0.49–1.31 ft) and a width of about 0.3 metres (0.98 ft). As with others in the genus, the leaves are strap-like and the flowers occur in clusters on stalks which arise from the base of the leaves. There are six tepals and six stamens, one at the base of each tepal-lobe. In his notes on his original description of the species, John Lindley noted "Conostylis abounds the most in species, some of which are handsome but others are mere weeds..... C. aurea is a much handsomer species....flowers of a bright golden yellow."

== Taxonomy and naming ==
The species was first formally described in 1840 by botanist John Lindley in A Sketch of the Vegetation of the Swan River Colony. The specific epithet (aurea) is derived from the Latin word aurum meaning "gold".

== Distribution ==
The golden conostylis occurs in the Avon Wheatbelt, Esperance Plains, Geraldton Sandplains, Jarrah Forest and Swan Coastal Plain biogeographical regions of Western Australia. It grows on white or yellow sand or gravelly loam in winter-wet situations.

== Conservation ==
Conostylis aurea is classified as not threatened by the Western Australian Government Department of Parks and Wildlife.
