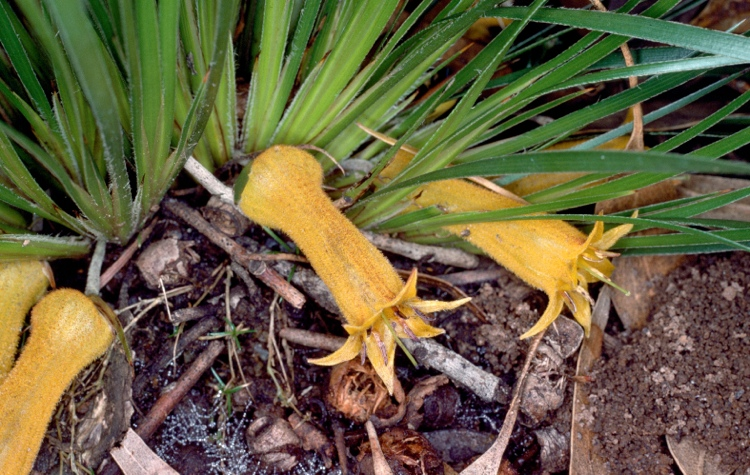

Scientific classification
- Kingdom: Plantae
- Clade: Tracheophytes
- Clade: Angiosperms
- Clade: Monocots
- Clade: Commelinids
- Order: Commelinales
- Family: Haemodoraceae
- Genus: Conostylis
- Species: C. bealiana

Binomial name
- Conostylis bealiana F.Muell.

= Conostylis bealiana =

Species of flowering plant

Conostylis bealiana is a flowering plant in the family Haemodoraceae and is endemic to Western Australia. It has green flat leaves and tubular dark yellow to orange-red flowers.

== Description ==
Conostylis bealiana is a tufted, prostrate, grass-like perennial, 0.1–0.15 m (3.9 in – 5.9 in) high and forming clumps up to 0.3 m (1 ft 0 in) wide. The leaves are green, hairy on both surfaces, flat, soft, flexible, 70–230 mm (2.8–9.1 in) long, 1–1.5 mm (0.039–0.059 in) wide with fine, flattened hairs on the leaf margins. The flowers are borne singly, straight, hairy, yellow to orange-red, 25–45 mm (0.98–1.77 in) long, bracts 5.5–6.5 mm (0.22–0.26 in) long, lobes 4.5–7.5 mm (0.18–0.30 in) long on a pedicel 5–17 mm (0.20–0.67 in) long. Flowering occurs from July to September.

== Taxonomy and naming ==
Conostylis bealiana was first formally described in 1875 by Ferdinand von Mueller and the description was published in Fragmenta Phytographiae Australiae. The specific epithet (bealiana) is in honour of Amy Beal.

== Distribution and habitat ==
This conostylis grows in gravel, sand and sandy loam on the south coast of Western Australia.
