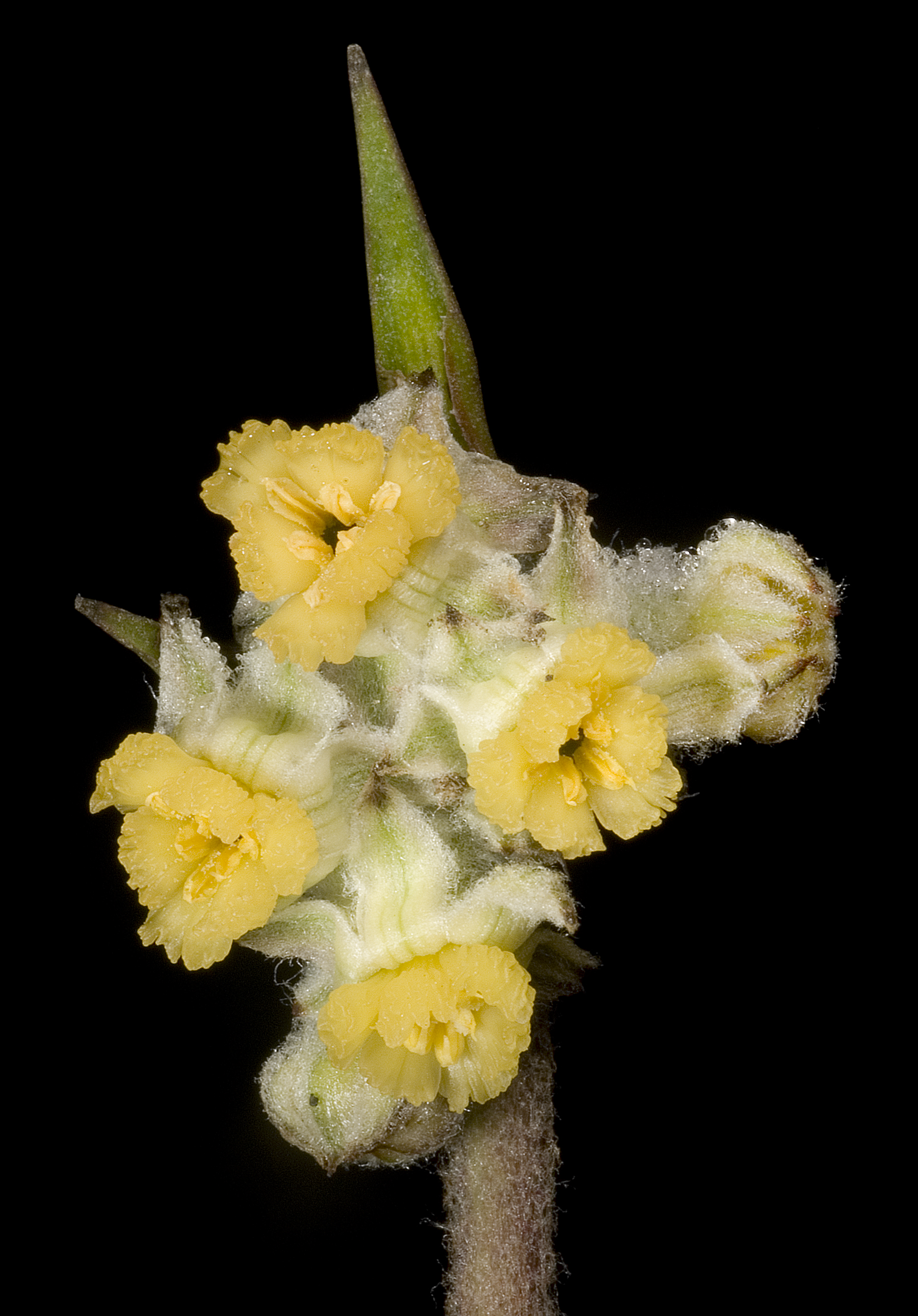

Scientific classification
- Kingdom: Plantae
- Clade: Tracheophytes
- Clade: Angiosperms
- Clade: Monocots
- Clade: Commelinids
- Order: Commelinales
- Family: Haemodoraceae
- Genus: Tribonanthes
- Species: T. brachypetala

Binomial name
- Tribonanthes brachypetala Lindl.
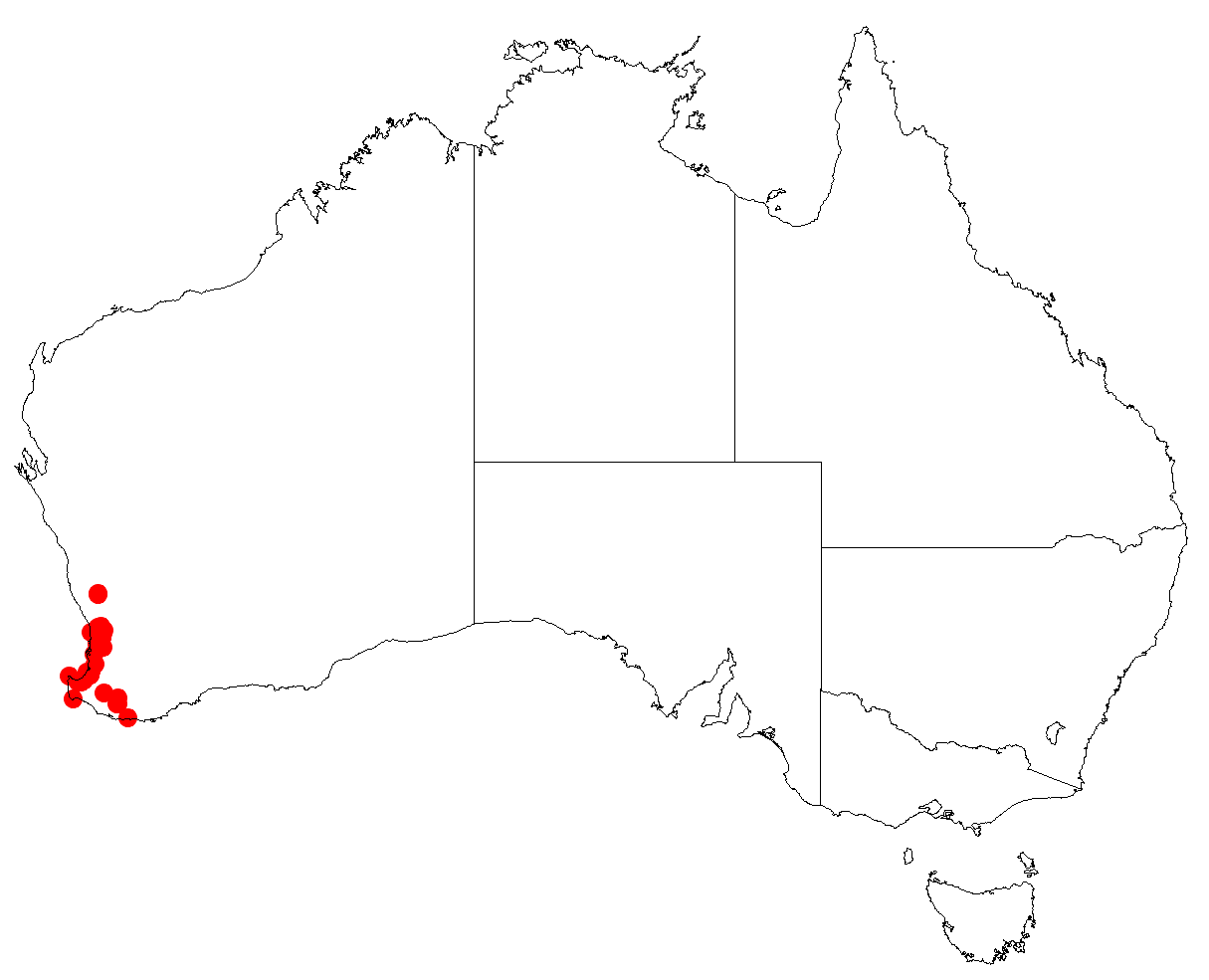
- Occurrence data from the Australasian Virtual Herbarium for T. brachypetala

= Tribonanthes brachypetala =

Species of flowering plant

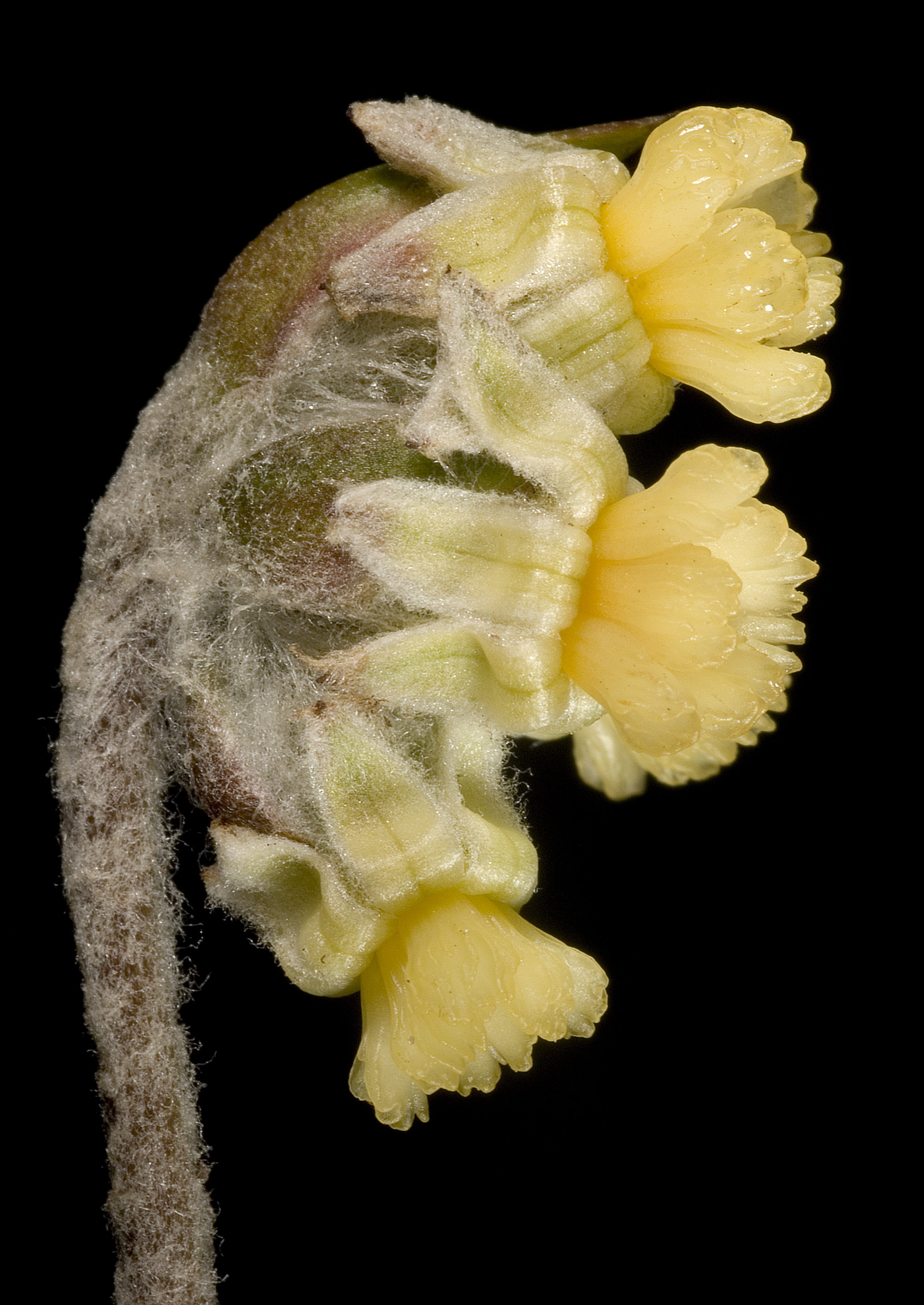

Tribonanthes brachypetala (common name Nodding tiurndin) is a species of the genus Tribonanthes in the bloodwort family, Haemodoraceae native to south western Western Australia.

It was first described by John Lindley in 1840. It is a tuberous perennial herb growing from 0.2 to 0.4 m high, in swamps and areas which are seasonally wet. It flowers from July to August.

The species epithet derives from the Greek brachys (short) and petalon (leaf, but here referring to petals) and describes the plant as having short petals.
