= Tribonanthes purpurea =

Conservation status
- Declared rare (DEC)

Scientific classification
- Kingdom: Plantae
- Clade: Tracheophytes
- Clade: Angiosperms
- Clade: Monocots
- Clade: Commelinids
- Order: Commelinales
- Family: Haemodoraceae
- Genus: Tribonanthes
- Species: T. purpurea

Binomial name
- Tribonanthes purpurea T.D.Macfarl. & Hopper
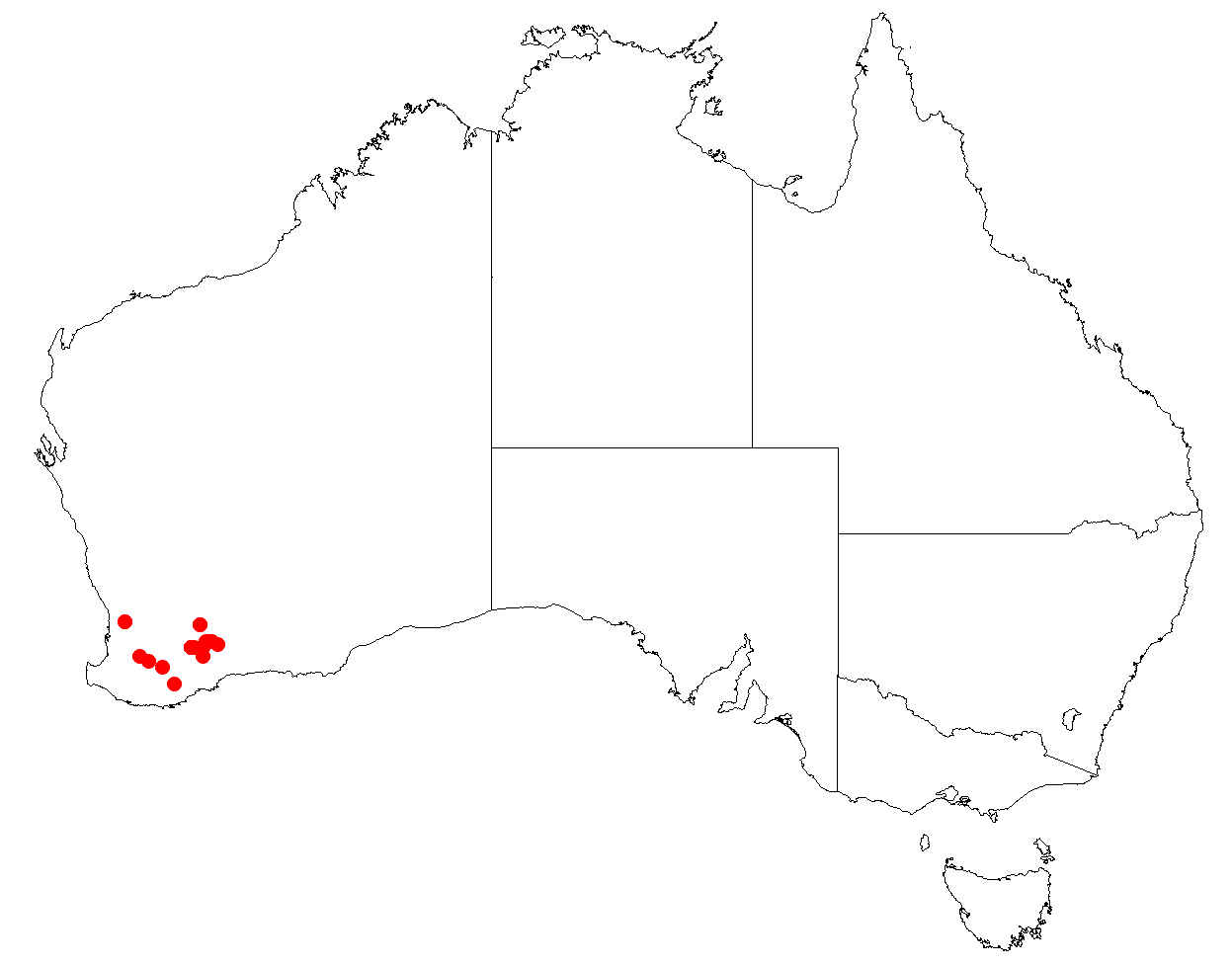
- Collection data for T. purpurea from the Australasian Virtual Herbarium

Species of flowering plant

Tribonanthes purpurea belongs to the genus Tribonanthes in the bloodwort family, Haemodoraceae. It was first described by Macfarlane and Hopper in 1987. It is a perennial herb growing from 0.03 to 0.04 m high, in seasonally wet moss and herbfields among granite rocks. Its pink to purple flowers are seen in August.

It is found in the IBRA regions: Avon Wheatbelt, Esperance Plains, Jarrah Forest and Mallee.
