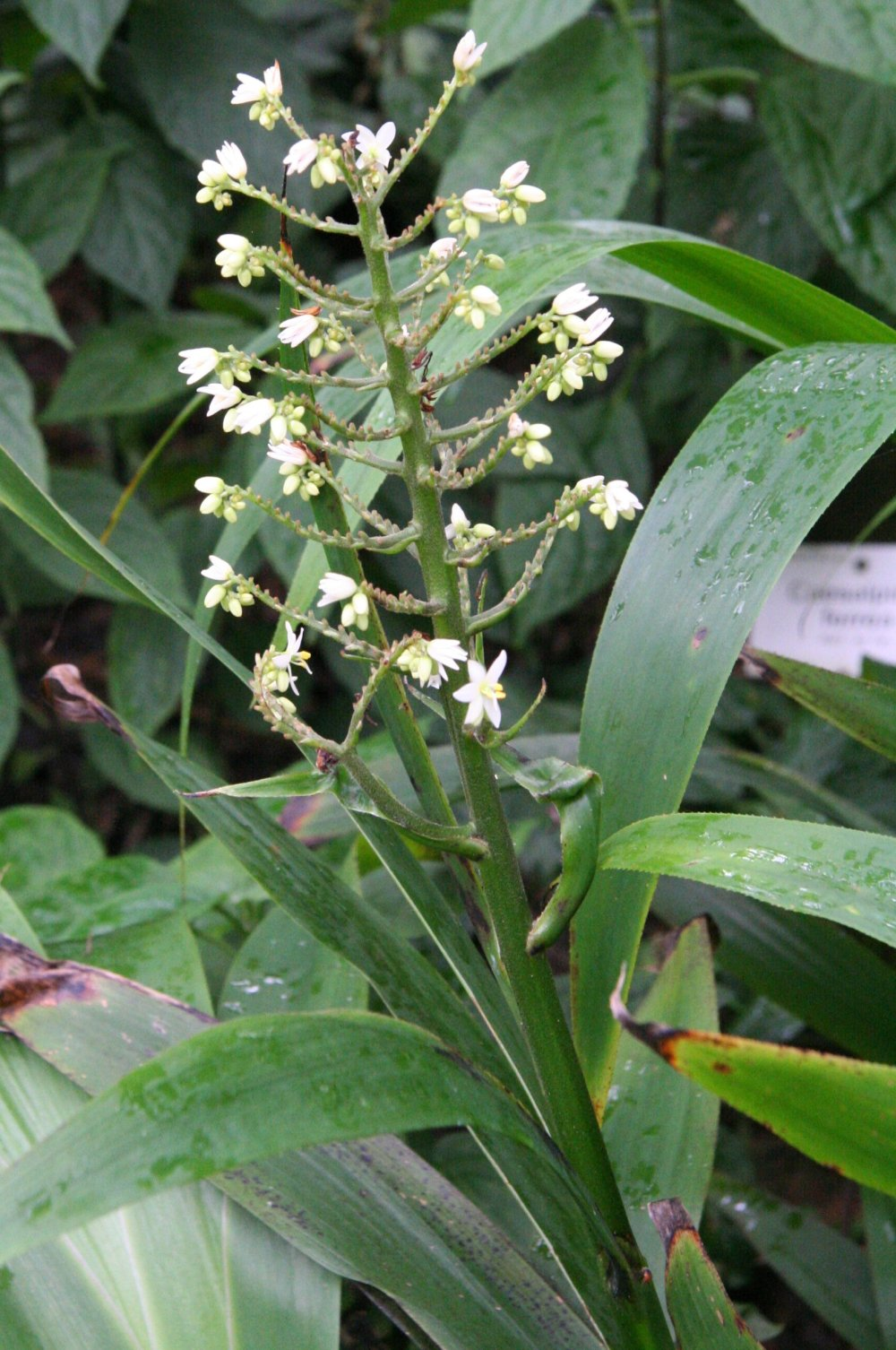
- Xiphidium caeruleum

Scientific classification
- Kingdom: Plantae
- Clade: Tracheophytes
- Clade: Angiosperms
- Clade: Monocots
- Clade: Commelinids
- Order: Commelinales
- Family: Haemodoraceae
- Subfamily: Haemodoroideae
- Genus: Xiphidium; Aubl. (1775)

Type species
- Xiphidium caeruleum Aubl.

Species
- Xiphidium caeruleum Aubl.; Xiphidium pontederiiflorum M.Pell., Hopper & Rhian J.Sm.

= Xiphidium =

Genus of flowering plants

Xiphidium is a genus of herbs in the family Haemodoraceae first described as a genus in 1775. It is native to tropical Americas, from southern Mexico through the Caribbean, Central America, and northern South America to Bolivia and central Brazil.

== species ==
Two species are accepted.

- Xiphidium caeruleum Aubl. - Mexico (Veracruz, Oaxaca, Chiapas, Tabasco, Puebla, Yucatán), Central America (all 7 countries), West Indies, South America (Colombia, Venezuela, Brazil (Acre, Amazonas, Roraima, Pará, Maranhão, Amapá), Guyana, Suriname, French Guiana, Ecuador, Peru, Bolivia)
- Xiphidium pontederiiflorum M.Pell., Hopper & Rhian J.Sm. – Panama, Colombia, and Ecuador

== formerly placed here ==
- Schiekia orinocensis (Kunth) Meisn. (as Xiphidium angustifolium Willd. ex Link)
- Cubanicula xanthorrhizos (C.Wright ex Griseb.) Hopper, J.E.Gut., E.J.Hickman, M.Pell. & Rhian J.Sm. (as Xiphidium xanthorrhizon C.Wright ex Griseb.)

== Phylogeny ==
Comparison of homologous DNA has increased the insight in the phylogenetic relationships between the genera in the Haemodoroideae subfamily. The following trees represent those insights.

- subfamily Haemodoroideae
  - - Dilatris
    - - Lachnanthes
      - Haemodorum
  - - - Barberetta
      - Wachendorfia
    - - Schiekia
      - Xiphidium
