= Tricarpelema pumilum =

Scientific classification
- Kingdom: Plantae
- Clade: Tracheophytes
- Clade: Angiosperms
- Clade: Monocots
- Clade: Commelinids
- Order: Commelinales
- Family: Commelinaceae
- Genus: Tricarpelema
- Species: T. pumilum

Binomial name
- Tricarpelema pumilum (Hallier f.) Faden

Synonyms
- Pollia pumila Hallier f.

Species of plant

Tricarpelema pumilum is a monocotyledonous herbaceous plant in the family Commelinaceae. It is known from only six collections on the island of Borneo. The species looks like a smaller version of the closely related Tricarpelema philippense, but the two can be differentiated based on the size and shape of the capsule, as well as the number of seeds per locule.

== Distribution and habitat ==
Tricarpelema pumilum has only been collected 6 times, all of which were made on the island of Borneo in the Malay Archipelago. One collection was made in the Temburong district of Brunei, one was made in the Kapit Division in eastern Malaysia's state of Sarawak, while the remaining 4 have their origins in Kalimantan in Indonesia.
