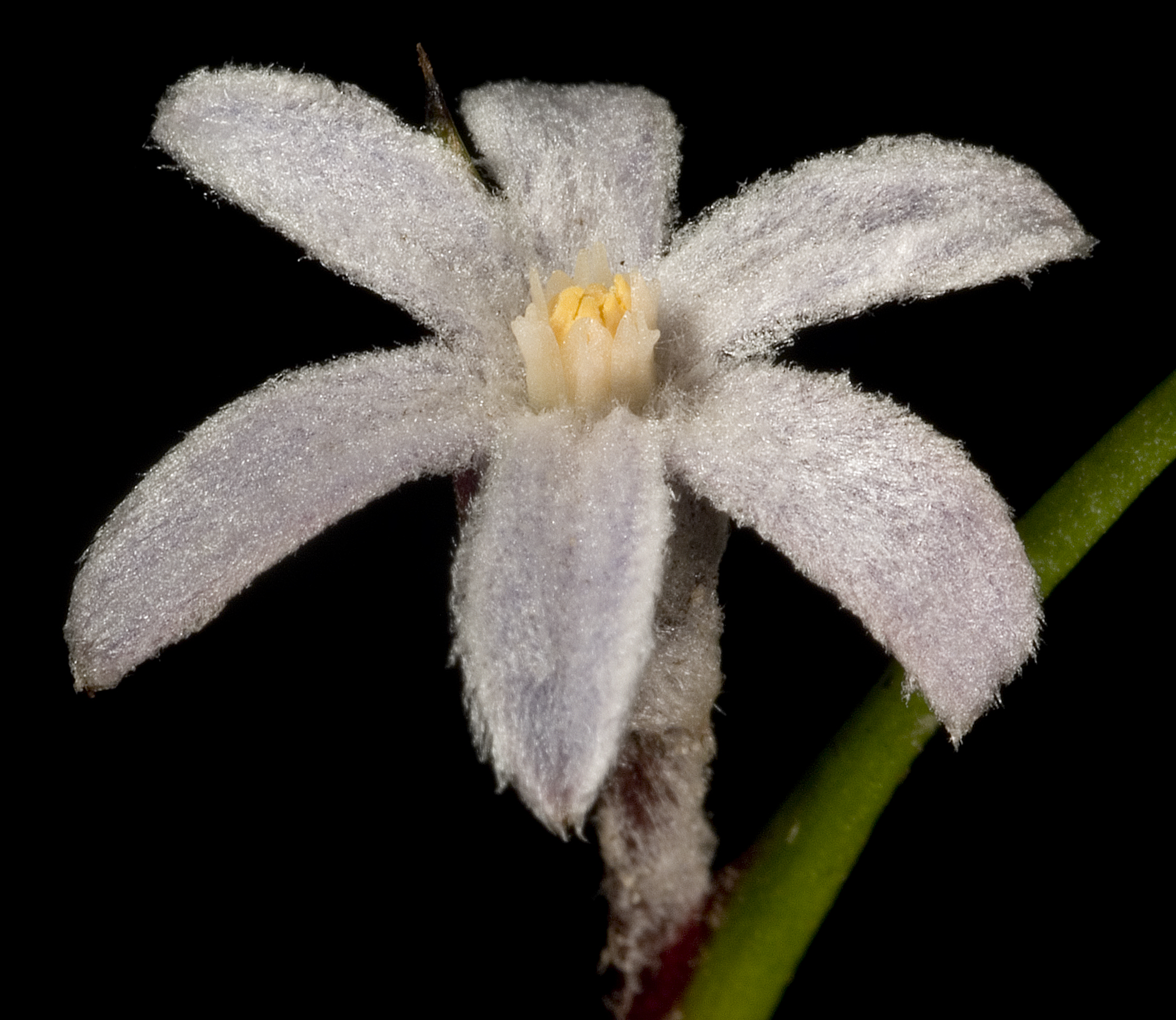

Scientific classification
- Kingdom: Plantae
- Clade: Tracheophytes
- Clade: Angiosperms
- Clade: Monocots
- Clade: Commelinids
- Order: Commelinales
- Family: Haemodoraceae
- Genus: Tribonanthes
- Species: T. violacea

Binomial name
- Tribonanthes violacea Endl.
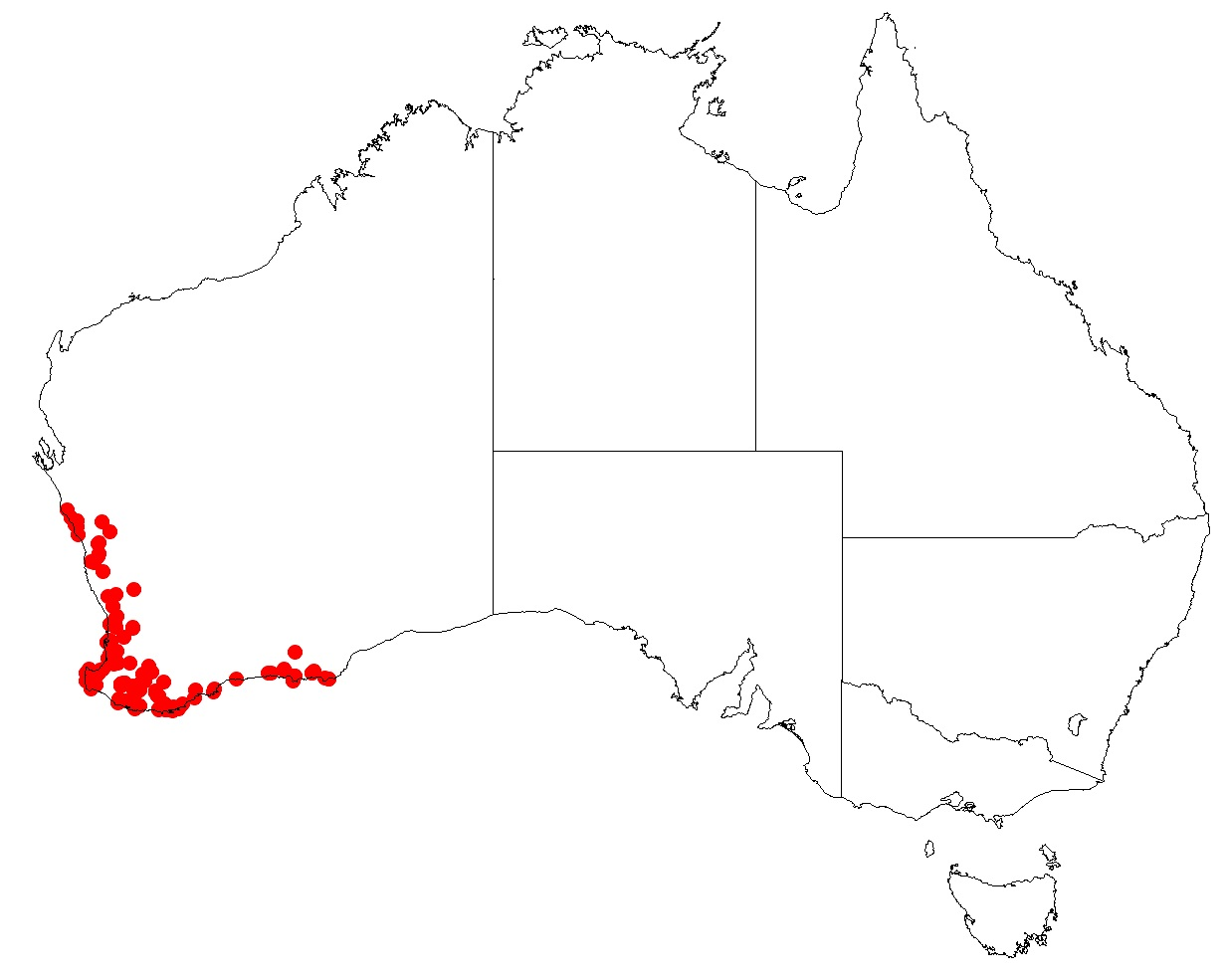
- Collection data for T. violacea from the Australasian Virtual Herbarium

= Tribonanthes violacea =

Species of flowering plant

Tribonanthes violacea belongs to the genus Tribonanthes in the bloodwort family, Haemodoraceae. It was first described by Stephan Endlicher in 1846. It is a perennial herb growing from 0.05 to 0.2 m high, in peat, white, grey or yellow sands, clay loams and granite in areas which are seasonally wet and on granite outcrops. Its white to purple flowers are seen from July to October.

It is found in the IBRA regions: Avon Wheatbelt, Esperance Plains, Geraldton Sandplains, Jarrah Forest, Swan Coastal Plain and Warren.
