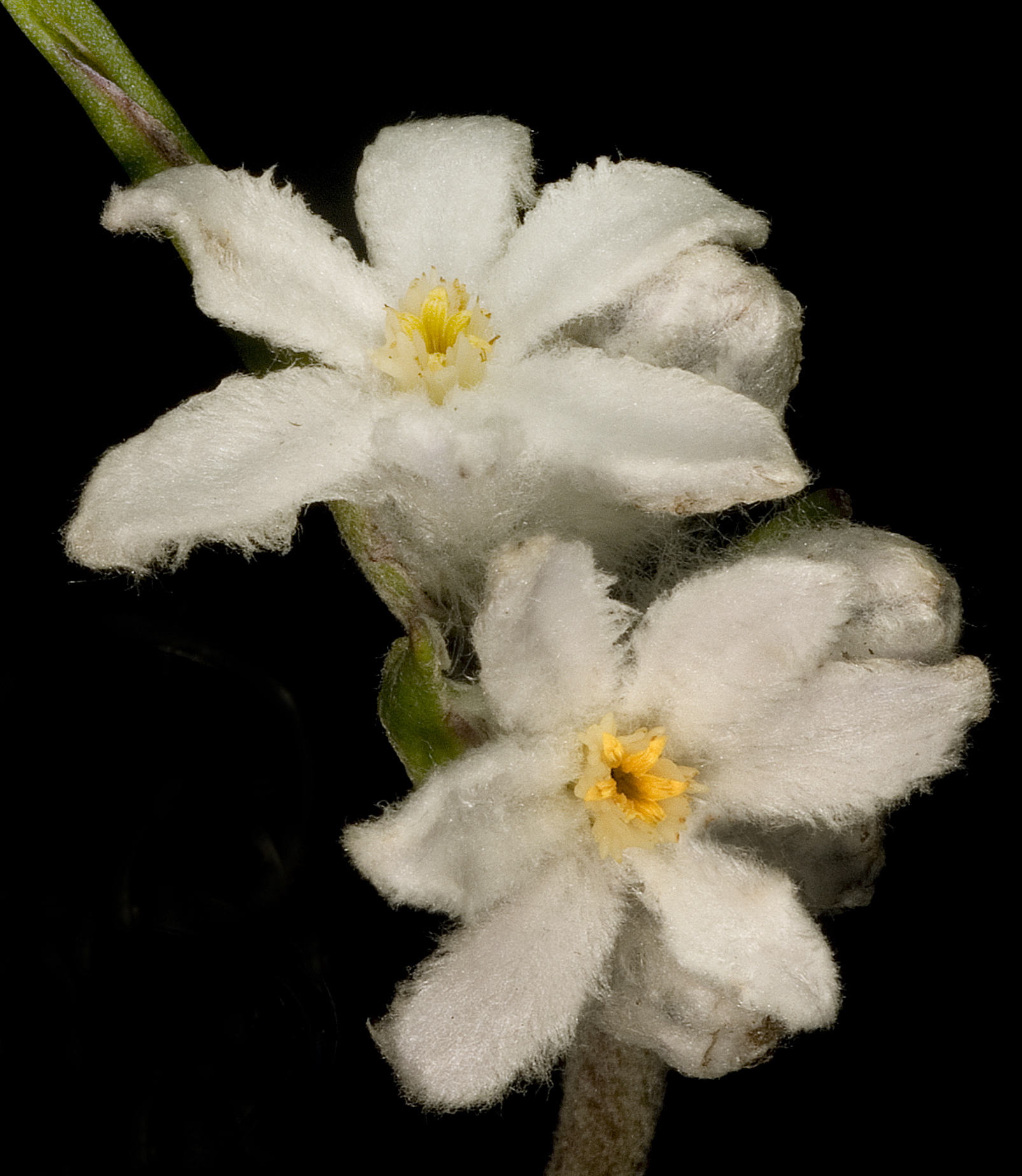

Scientific classification
- Kingdom: Plantae
- Clade: Tracheophytes
- Clade: Angiosperms
- Clade: Monocots
- Clade: Commelinids
- Order: Commelinales
- Family: Haemodoraceae
- Genus: Tribonanthes
- Species: T. australis

Binomial name
- Tribonanthes australis Endl.
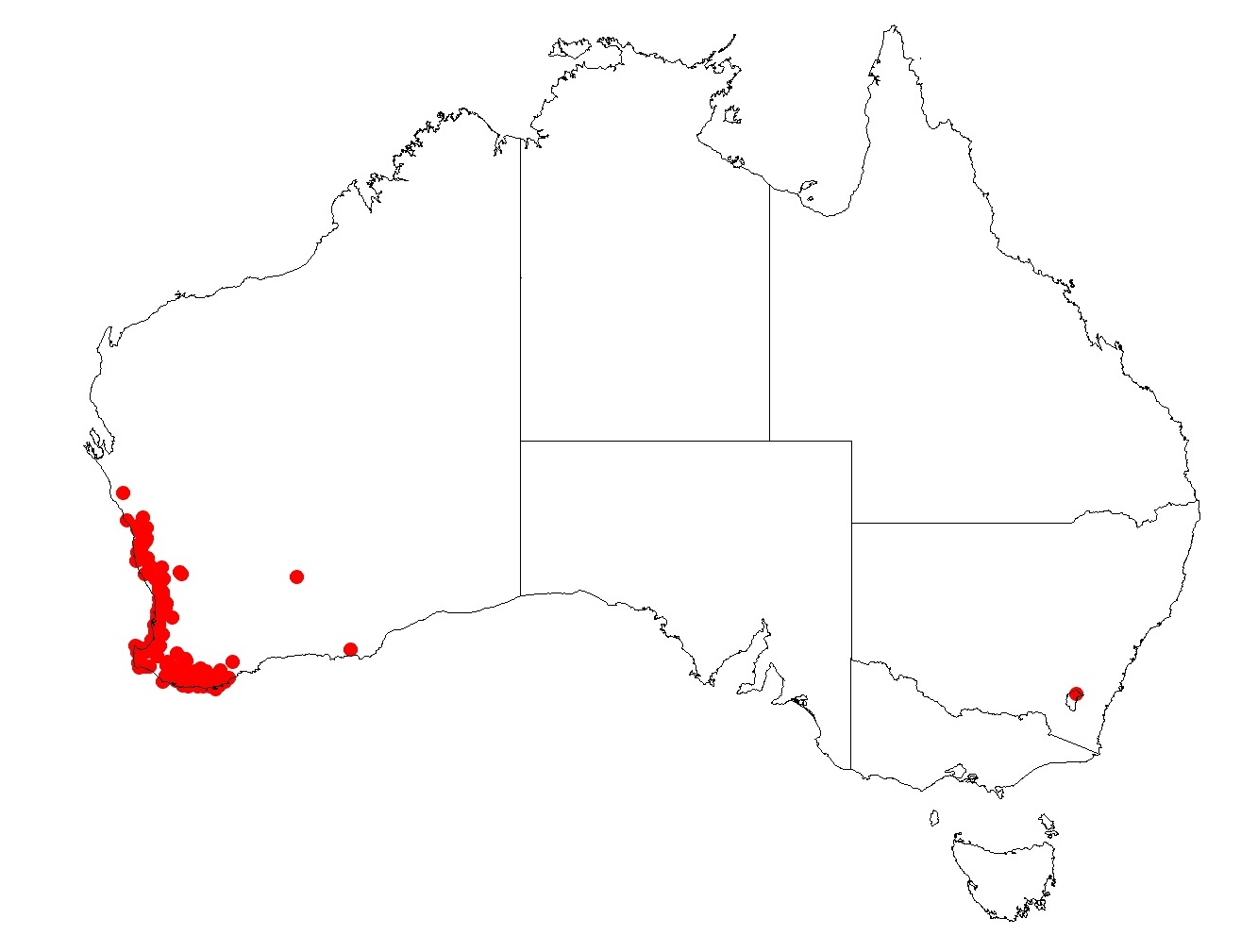
- Collection data from the Australasian Virtual Herbarium for T. australis

= Tribonanthes australis =

Species of flowering plant

Tribonanthes australis is the type species of the genus Tribonanthes in the bloodwort family, Haemodoraceae in south western Western Australia.

It was first described by Stephan Endlicher in 1839. It is a tuberous perennial herb growing from 0.15m to 0.4 m high, in peaty, black sand and sandy clay soils in swamps and areas which are seasonally wet. It flowers from August to November.
