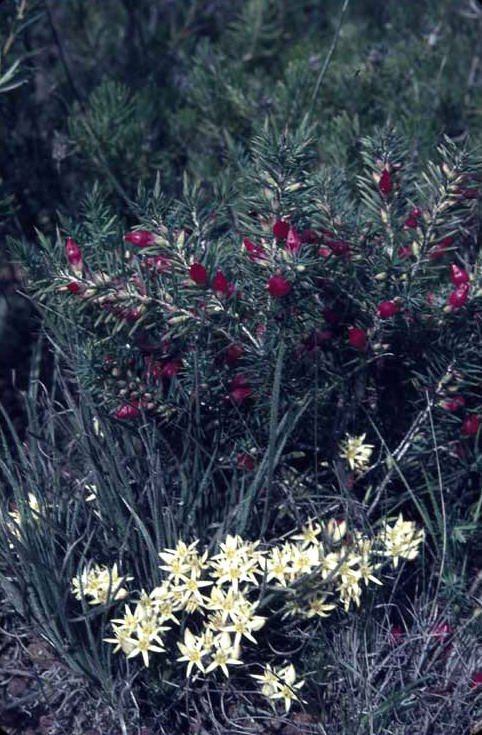

Scientific classification
- Kingdom: Plantae
- Clade: Tracheophytes
- Clade: Angiosperms
- Clade: Monocots
- Clade: Commelinids
- Order: Commelinales
- Family: Haemodoraceae
- Genus: Conostylis
- Species: C. dielsii

Binomial name
- Conostylis dielsii W.Fitzg.
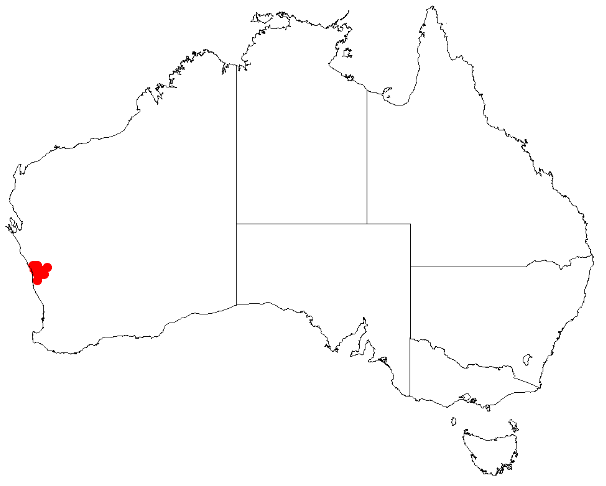
- Occurrence data from AVH

Synonyms
- Conostylis psammophila Diels nom. inval., pro syn.

= Conostylis dielsii =

Species of flowering plant

Conostylis dielsii is a tufted perennial, grass-like plant or herb in the family Haemodoraceae and is endemic to the south-west of Western Australia. It forms short rhizomes, and has cylindrical leaves and creamy-yellow flowers.

== Description ==
Conostylis dielsii is a tufted perennial, grass-like plant or herb that forms short rhizomes and typically grows to 13–33 cm (5.1–13.0 in) high. The leaves are round in cross-section, 7–330 mm (0.28–12.99 in) long and 0.5–1.8 mm (0.020–0.071 in) wide and glabrous, apart from woolly hairs at the base. The flowers are arranged in dense cymes or heads on a hairy flowering stalk 40–100 mm (1.6–3.9 in) long with leaf-like bracts 6–15 mm (0.24–0.59 in) long. The perianth is creamy-yellow, 7.5–10 mm (0.30–0.39 in) long with lobes 4–6 mm (0.16–0.24 in) long. The anthers are 2.5–4 mm (0.098–0.157 in) long and the style 6.0–8.5 mm (0.24–0.33 in) long. Flowering occurs in July and August.

== Taxonomy and naming ==
Conostylis dielsii was first formally described in 1903 by William Vincent Fitzgerald in the Journal and Proceedings of the Mueller Botanic Society of Western Australia from a specimen collected near Mingenew by Ludwig Diels. The specific epithet (dielsii) honours the collector of the type specimens.

In 1987, Stephen Hopper described two subspecies of C. dielsii in the Flora of Australia, and the names are accepted by the Australian Plant Census:

- Conostylis dielsii W.Fitzg. subsp. dielsii has leaves 70–155 mm (2.8–6.1 in) long and 0.8–1.8 mm (0.031–0.071 in) wide, the flowering stalk 20–100 mm (0.79–3.94 in) long.
- Conostylis dielsii subsp. teres Hopper has leaves 130–330 mm (5.1–13.0 in) long and less than 1.0 mm (0.039 in) wide, the flowering stalk 10–145 mm (0.39–5.71 in) long.

== Distribution and habitat ==
This species of conostylis grows in low open woodland in sand and gravel between Mingenew, Walkaway and the Arrowsmith River in the Avon Wheatbelt and Geraldton Sandplains bioregions of south-western Western Australia. Subspecies teres grows in heath and low open woodland and is restricted to uplands inland from Walkaway in the Geraldton Sandplains bioregion.

== Conservation status ==
Conostylis dielsii is listed as "not threatened" but subsp. teres is listed as Threatened" by the Western Australian Government Department of Biodiversity, Conservation and Attractions, meaning that it is in danger of extinction.
