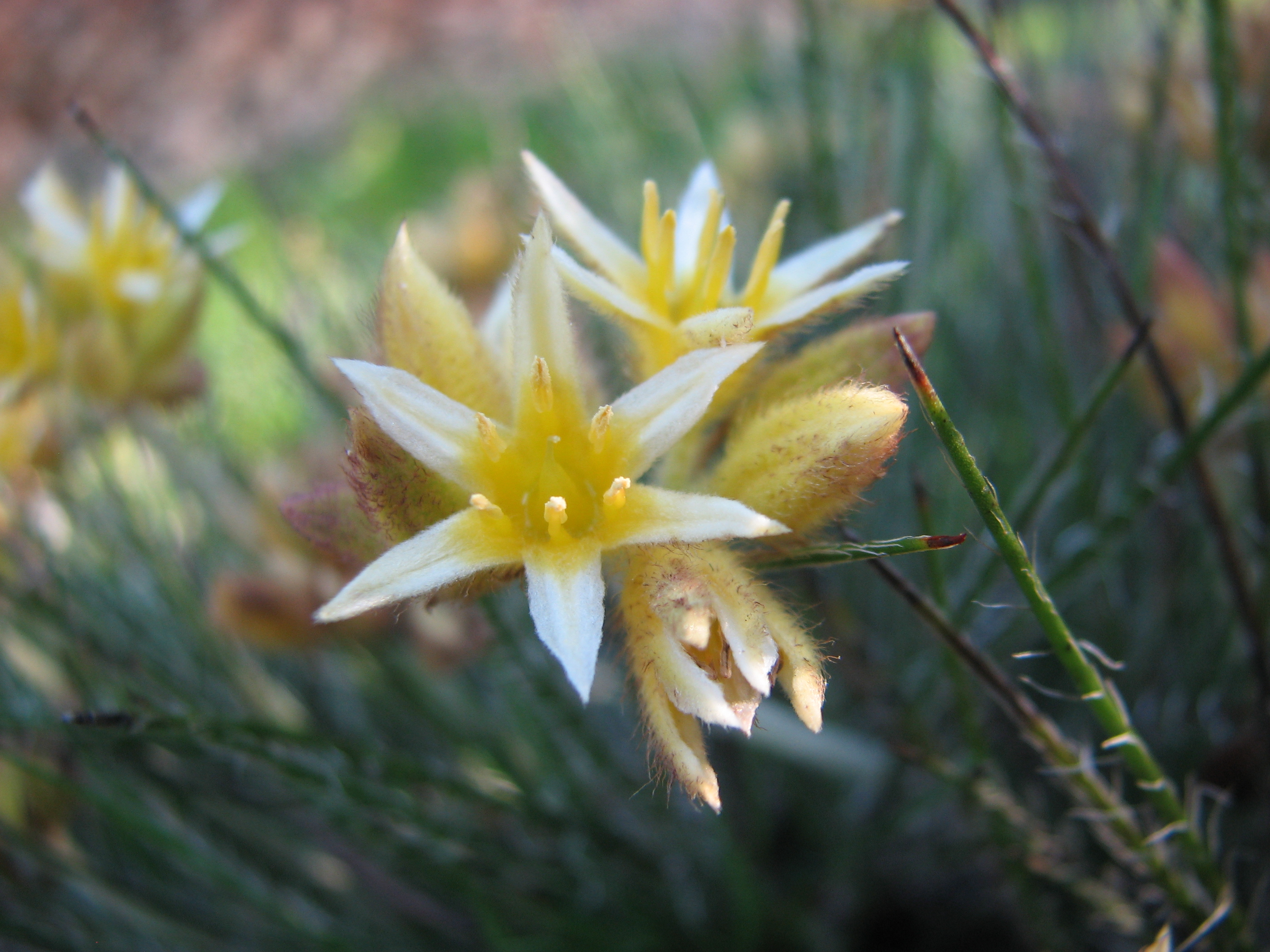
- In Maranoa Gardens

Scientific classification
- Kingdom: Plantae
- Clade: Tracheophytes
- Clade: Angiosperms
- Clade: Monocots
- Clade: Commelinids
- Order: Commelinales
- Family: Haemodoraceae
- Genus: Conostylis
- Species: C. setigera

Binomial name
- Conostylis setigera R.Br.

= Conostylis setigera =

Species of flowering plant

Conostylis setigera, commonly known as bristly cottonhead, is a rhizomatous, tufted perennial, grass-like plant or herb in the family Haemodoraceae and is endemic to the south-west of Western Australia.

== Description ==
Conostylis setigera is a rhizomatous, tufted, perennial grass-like plant or herb that typically grows to a height of 5–36 cm (2.0–14.2 in). It has flat leaves 80–360 mm (3.1–14.2 in) long, 1–4 mm (0.039–0.157 in) wide, green with striations and glabrous apart from several ranks of hairs on the edges. The flowers are borne in a head of 5 to 10 flowers on a flowering stem 40–200 mm (1.6–7.9 in) long. The flowers are yellow and woolly-hairy with lobes 5–9 mm (0.20–0.35 in) long. The anthers are 2.0–3.5 mm (0.079–0.138 in) long and the style is 6–11.5 mm (0.24–0.45 in) long. Flowering occurs from August to November.

== Taxonomy and naming ==
Conostylis setigera was first formally described in 1810 by Robert Brown in his Prodromus Florae Novae Hollandiae et Insulae Van Diemen. The specific epithet (setigera) means "bearing bristles".

In 1987, Stephen Hopper described 2 subspecies of C. setigera in the Flora of Australia and the names are accepted by the Australian Plant Census:

- Conostylis setigera subsp. dasys Hopper has leaves with shaggy hairs and flowers between October and November.
- Conostylis setigera F.Muell. subsp. setigera has glabrous leaves, except on the edges, or sometimes with a few sparse hairs, and flowers between August and October.

== Distribution and habitat ==
This species of conostylis is widespread and common in Western Australia growing in sand, loam, gravel an laterite in the Avon Wheatbelt, Esperance Plains, Geraldton Sandplains, Jarrah Forest, Mallee, Swan Coastal Plain and Warren bioregions of the south-west of Western Australia. Subspecies dasys is restricted to areas near Kojonup in the Jarrah Forest bioregion.

== Conservation status ==
Conostylis setigera is listed as "not threatened" by the Western Australian Government Department of Biodiversity, Conservation and Attractions but subsp. dasys is listed as "Threatened Flora (Declared Rare Flora — Extant)" by the Western Australian Government Department of Biodiversity, Conservation and Attractions.
