= Pyrrorhiza =

Scientific classification
- Kingdom: Plantae
- Clade: Tracheophytes
- Clade: Angiosperms
- Clade: Monocots
- Clade: Commelinids
- Order: Commelinales
- Family: Haemodoraceae
- Subfamily: Haemodoroideae
- Genus: Pyrrorhiza; Maguire & Wurdack
- Species: P. neblinae

Binomial name
- Pyrrorhiza neblinae Maguire & Wurdack

Genus of herbs

Pyrrorhiza is a genus of herbs in the family Haemodoraceae, first described as a genus in 1957. It contains only one known species, Pyrrorhiza neblinae, endemic to the Sierra de la Neblina in Amazonas State, Venezuela.
