= Tricarpelema brevipedicellatum =

Conservation status
- Endangered (IUCN 2.3)

Scientific classification
- Kingdom: Plantae
- Clade: Tracheophytes
- Clade: Angiosperms
- Clade: Monocots
- Clade: Commelinids
- Order: Commelinales
- Family: Commelinaceae
- Genus: Tricarpelema
- Species: T. brevipedicellatum

Binomial name
- Tricarpelema brevipedicellatum Faden

Species of plant

Tricarpelema brevipedicellatum is a monocotyledonous herbaceous plant in the family Commelinaceae. The species is known from only two collections made in Vietnam and very little is known about it.
