= Tricarpelema glanduliferum =

Scientific classification
- Kingdom: Plantae
- Clade: Tracheophytes
- Clade: Angiosperms
- Clade: Monocots
- Clade: Commelinids
- Order: Commelinales
- Family: Commelinaceae
- Genus: Tricarpelema
- Species: T. glanduliferum

Binomial name
- Tricarpelema glanduliferum (J.Joseph & R.S.Rao) R.S.Rao

Species of plant

Tricarpelema glanduliferum is a monocotyledonous herbaceous plant in the family Commelinaceae. It is known from only two collections from India and Vietnam respectively. The species is distinctive within the genus due to its small leaves and the dense glandular hairs found on the inflorescences.
