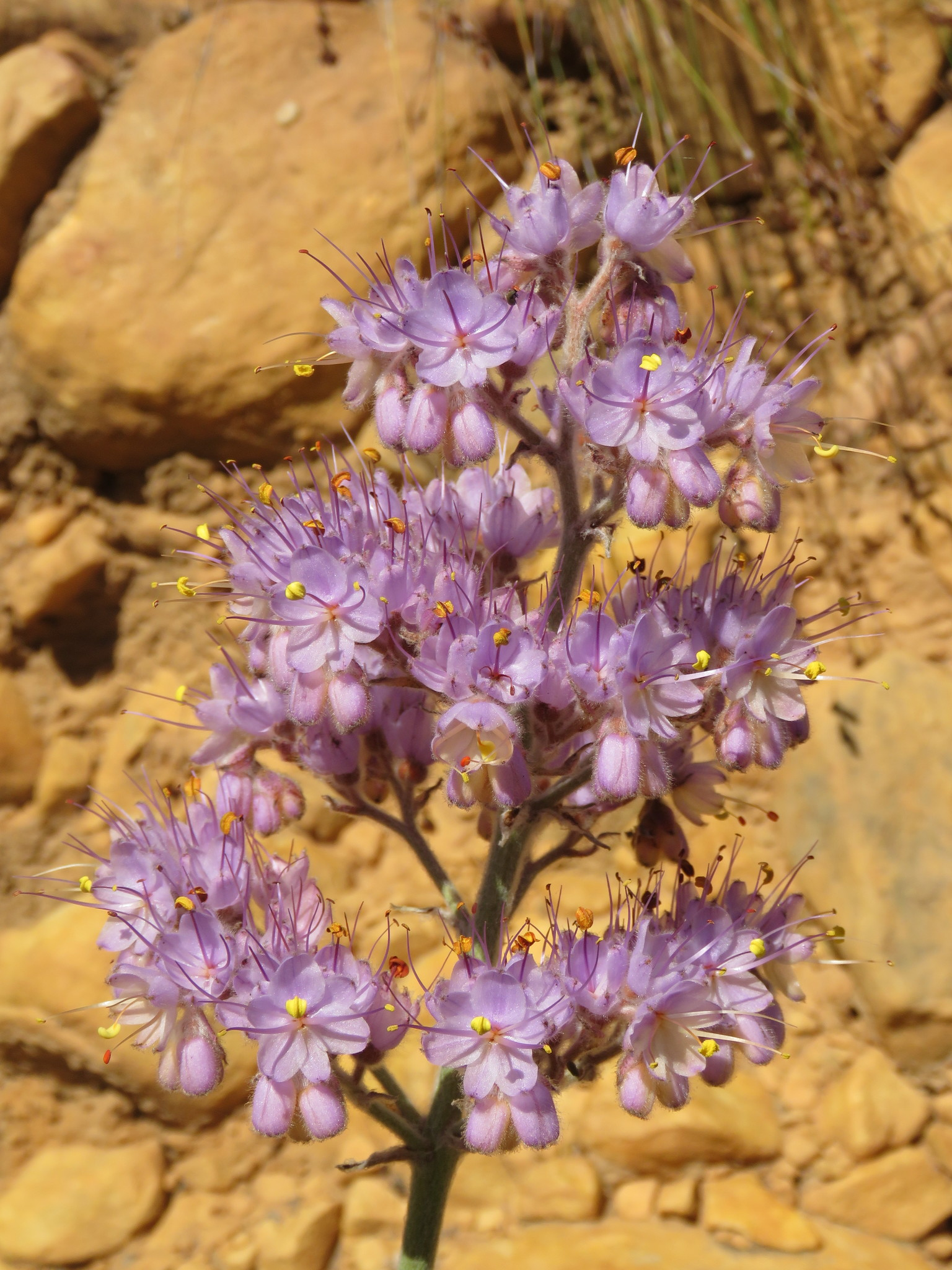
- Dilatris ixioides

Scientific classification
- Kingdom: Plantae
- Clade: Tracheophytes
- Clade: Angiosperms
- Clade: Monocots
- Clade: Commelinids
- Order: Commelinales
- Family: Haemodoraceae
- Subfamily: Haemodoroideae
- Genus: Dilatris; P.J.Bergius

Type species
- Dilatris corymbosa P.J.Bergius

= Dilatris =

Genus of flowering plants

Dilatris is a genus of four species of evergreen perennial herbaceous plants of up to 60 cm (2.0 ft) high, that are assigned to the bloodroot family. The plants have hairless, line- to lance-shaped leaves set in a fan that emerges from a red or orange coloured rootstock. Six free tepals with some gland dots near their tips are present on the mauve or dirty yellow flowers' six free petals. The other two stamens are longer and spreading with smaller scarlet anthers, while the one stamen is short, upright, and has a large, yellow anther. The style is diverted from the centre opposite both longer stamens. The species only occur in the Western Cape and Northern Cape provinces of South Africa.

== Description ==
The species of Dilatris are evergreen, perennial herbaceous plants with a short underground rootstock that is bright red or orange inside. From the rootstock emerge several hairless, line- to oblong lance-shaped leaves that are laterally flattened resulting in a right and left surface rather than an upper and lower surface. The inflorescence is a thyrse with branches forking and the flowers forming a simple or tiered rounded surface. The stem is softly hairy or, in D. viscosa, has gland-tipped hairs. The stem carries few leathery, softly or, in D. viscosa, glandularly hairy bracts that enclose the branches at their base. Flower buds are upright or, in D. viscosa, nodding, and the open flowers are upright. The not or lightly scented perianth is star-symmetrical, saucer- or cup-shaped, and consist of six free, long-lived tepals that become papery after flowering. The tepals have few to many gland dots towards their tip, and are softly or, in D. viscosa, glandularly hairy, mauve or, in D. viscosa, dirty yellow and stained orange on the reverse. The three stamens are inserted at the base of each of the inner tepals, unequal in size. The stamens consist of an awl- to thread-shaped filament and an anther. The filament closest to the branch tip is shorter and upright and carries a large yellow anther. The longer two filaments, facing away from the tip of the branch, are somewhat spreading and carry smaller reddish anthers. The egg-shaped ovary is set below the attachment of tepals and stamens, contains three cavities and carries three nectaries at the top of each cavity walls. There is one ovule in each cavity. The style is thread-shaped and curves either to the right or to the left, opposing the long anthers, and is topped by the point-shaped stigma. The ovary develops into a capsule that either contains three loose seeds, in D. viscosa, or the fruits breaks into three fragments each containing one seed. The seeds are shield-shaped. The pollen grains have one groove along their length (monosulcate).

=== Differences between the species ===
Dilatris viscosa has leaves that are mostly more than 6 mm (0.24 in) wide, stems that are covered in red, gland-tipped hairs, leafy and somewhat swollen bracts, nodding flower buds, a star-shaped perianth that consists of six line- to lance-shaped tepals that are dirty yellow on the inside, stained orange on the back. Dilatris ixioides has leaves that are mostly 2–4 mm (0.079–0.157 in) wide, stems that are covered in white hairs without glands, bracts that are dry or cartilaginous higher on the stem, upright flower buds, a wide cup-shaped perianth consisting of six mauve tepals, each with two or three gland-dots near their tips, stamens that are 1½–2 times longer than tepals, the large anther 2.5–4 mm (0.098–0.157 in) long, about 3–4 times longer than smaller anthers. Dilatris pillansii has leaves that are mostly 3–5 mm (0.12–0.20 in) wide, stems that are covered in white, felty hairs of 1–2 mm (0.039–0.079 in) long without glands, three or four bracts that are leafy, the lower hairless except for the margins, those higher up increasingly felty hairy with adpressed hairs of 1–2 mm (0.039–0.079 in) long, upright flower buds, a cup-shaped perianth consisting of six mauve tepals, oval and incurved and 8–10 mm (0.31–0.39 in) long, the longer stamens much shorter than tepals with filaments of 3–4 mm (0.12–0.16 in) long and the large anther about 1.5 mm (0.059 in) long. Dilatris corymbosa has leaves that are mostly 5–6 mm (0.20–0.24 in) wide, stems that are covered in white, felty hairs of 2–3 mm (0.079–0.118 in) long without glands, four or five bracts that are leafy, the lower hairless except for the margins, those higher up increasingly felty hairy with adpressed hairs of 1–3 mm (0.039–0.118 in) long, a cup-shaped perianth consisting of six mauve tepals, elliptic and 10–13 mm (0.39–0.51 in) long, the longer stamens about as long or somewhat longer than the tepals with filaments of 6–8 mm (0.24–0.31 in) long and the large anther about 3 mm (0.12 in) long.

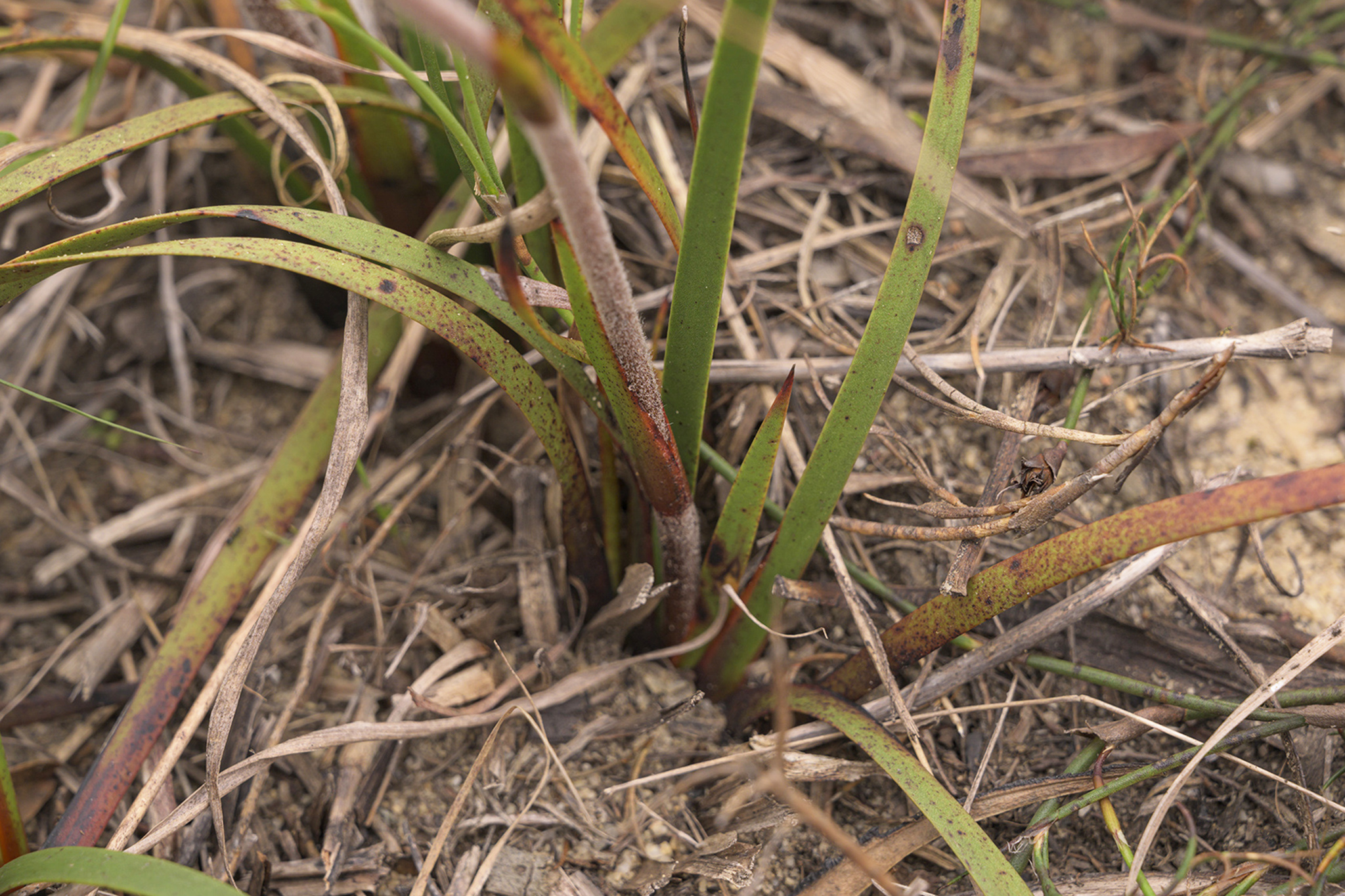
D. pillansii leaves

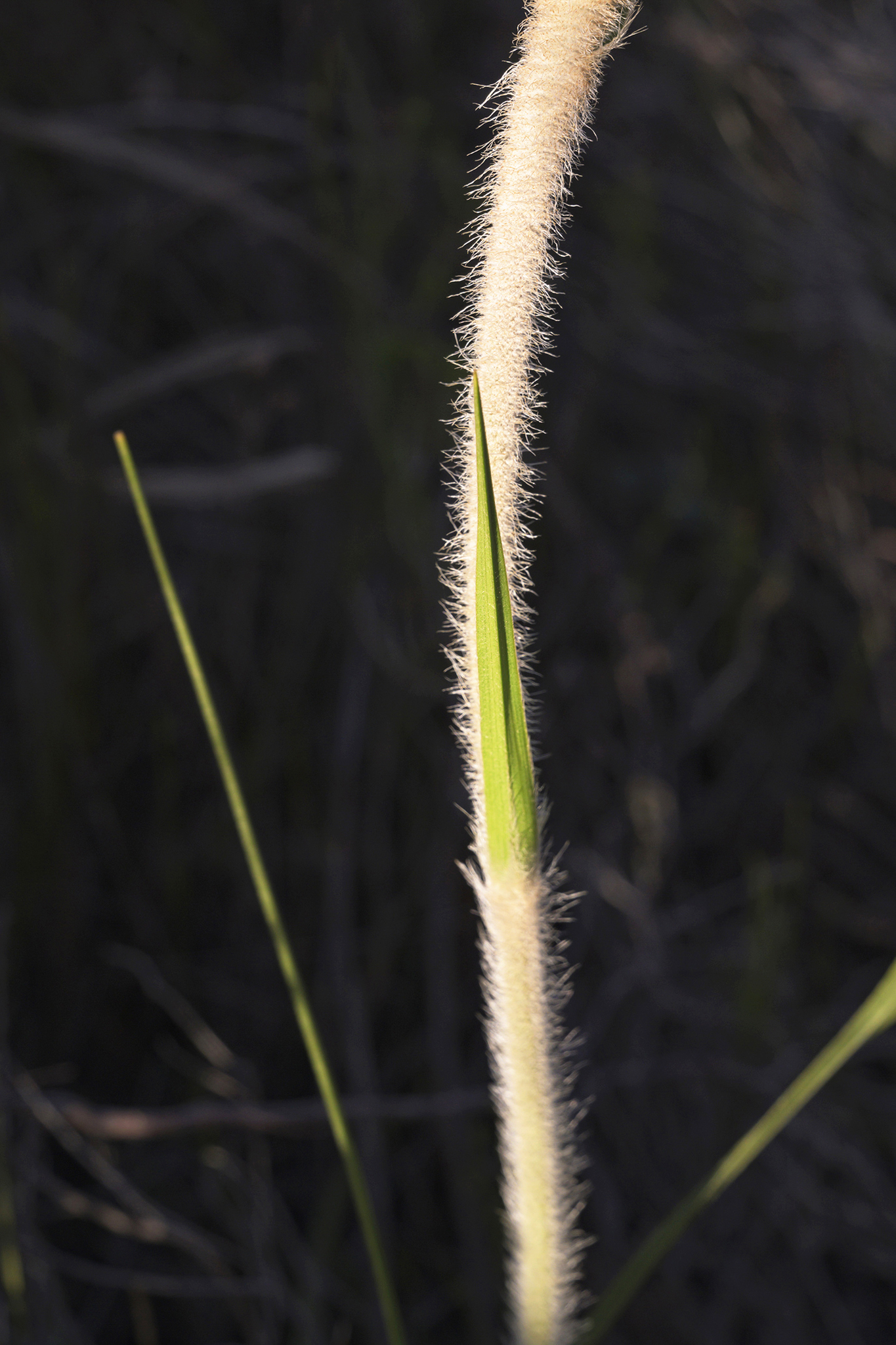
D. pillansii bract and stem

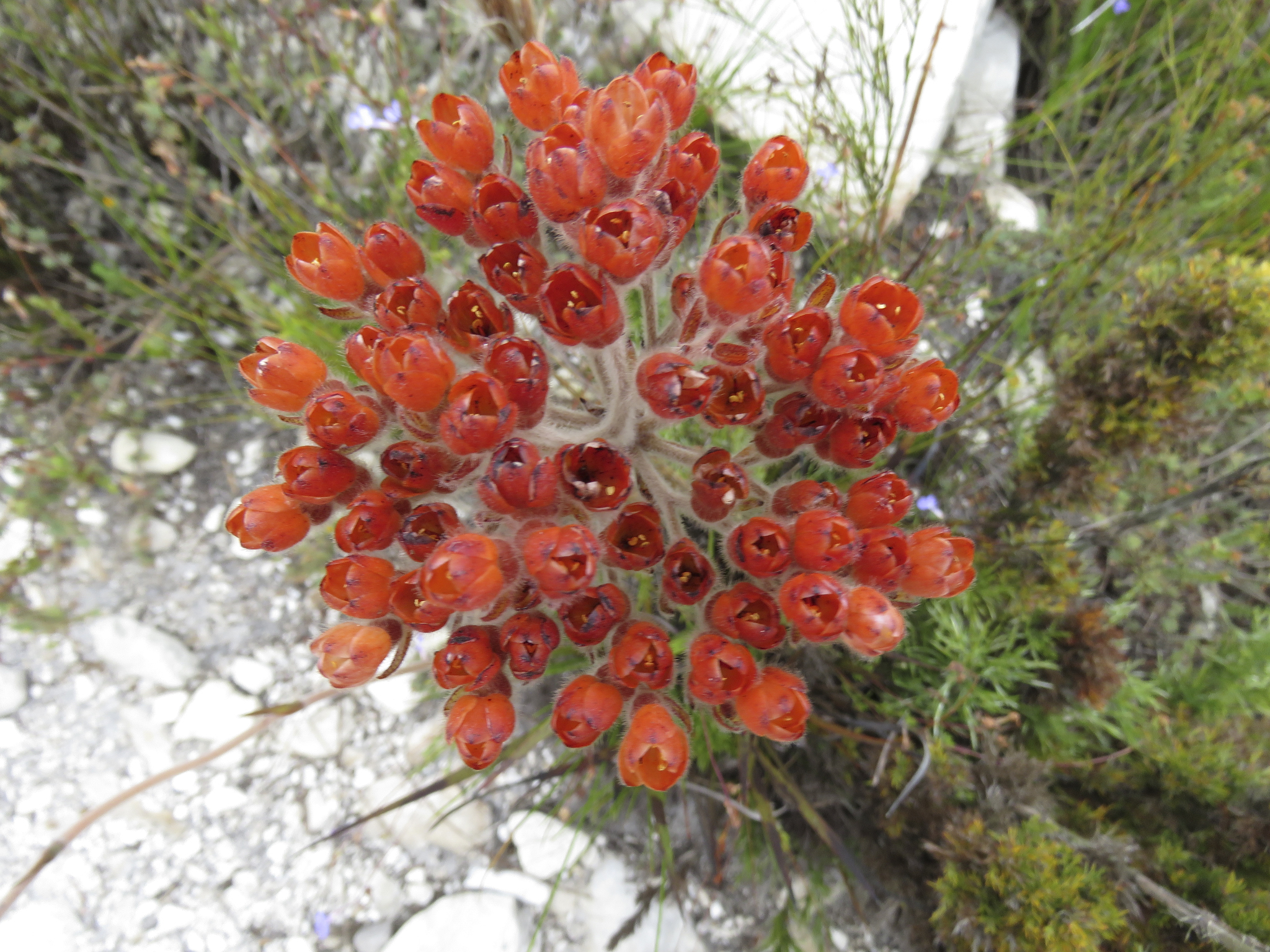
D. pillansii rust-coloured with age

== Taxonomy ==
Peter Jonas Bergius was the first to describe a species of bloodroot in 1767 and he named it Dilatris corymbosa based on a collection from the Cape of Good Hope. Later in 1767, Carl Linnaeus described the same species and named it Ixia hirsuta. Carl Linnaeus the Younger described in 1782 D. viscosa and D. paniculata. Jean-Baptiste Lamarck recognised a third species that he called D. ixioides in 1786. In 1896, John Gilbert Baker though there are just two species, the mauve-flowered D. corymbosa and the yellow-flowered D. viscosa. Winsome Fanny Barker in 1940 was of the opinion that both D. ixioides and D. paniculata should be distinguished, and she also described D. pillansii. Peter Goldblatt and John Charles Manning in 2000 considered D. paniculata a synonym of D. viscosa.

=== Naming ===
The genus name Dilatris is compounded from the Ancient Greek words δις (dis) meaning two and λάτρις (latris) meaning servant, a reference to the two stamens with much smaller anthers than that of the third stamen.

=== Phylogeny ===
The most recent common ancestor of the species of Dilatris is estimated to have lived about 9 million years ago. Comparison of homologous DNA has increased the insight in the phylogenetic relationships between the genera in the Haemodoroideae subfamily. The following tree represents those insights. The comparison of DNA from the species of Dilatris produced inconclusive results.

- subfamily Haemodoroideae
  - - Dilatris
    - - Lachnanthes
      - Haemodorum
  - - - Xiphidium
      - Schiekia
    - - Barberetta
      - Wachendorfia

=== Subdivision ===
The genus Dilatris is divided into two subgenera. These are Dilatris and Paradilatris.

Section	Image	Habit	Scientific name	Distribution
Section Dilatris			D. corymbosa P.J.Bergius 1767	SW. Cape Prov.
Section Dilatris			D. ixioides Lam., 1786	SW. Cape Prov.
Section Dilatris			D. pillansii W.F.Barker 1940	W.F.Barker
Section Paradilatris			D. viscosa L.f. 1782	SW. Cape Prov.

=== Reassigned species ===
The species that were originally described as Dilatris, which since have been reassigned include the following:

- Dilatris caroliniana = Lachnanthes caroliniana
- Dilatris heritiera = Lachnanthes caroliniana
- Dilatris hexandra = Lanaria lanata
- Dilatris tinctoria = Lachnanthes caroliniana

== Distribution and conservation ==
D. corymbosa is an endemic to the Cape Peninsula, where it occurs from the Twelve Apostles to Cape Point. It has the smallest distribution area of any species in the genus in the wild. D. ixioides has the largest distribution and can be found from the Gifberg, Piketberg and the Kouebokkeveld Mountains in the north to the Hex River and Wemmershoek Mountains in south along the Riviersonderend Mountains all the way east to the Langeberg and the Outeniqua Mountains, and inland onto the southern slopes of the Swartberg. D. pillansii is present from southern Cape Peninsula, via Hottentots Holland and the Kogelberg, along the Kleinrivier Mountains to the hills near Bredasdorp all the way to the Potberg in the east. D. viscosa grows from the Elandskloof Mountains in the north to Hottentots Holland and the Kogelberg in the south and east along the Riviersonderend Mountains. Isolated populations of this species can be found on the Langeberg in the east and on Table Mountain and Constantiaberg in the west. All four species of Dilatris are considered least-concern species.
