= T. giganteum =

T. giganteum may refer to:

- Titanomyrma giganteum, a species of fossil giant ant discovered in Germany, formerly known as Formicium giganteum, and the largest species of ant ever recorded.
- Tricarpelema giganteum, a monocotyledonous herbaceous plant species native to eastern India and Bhutan.

== See also ==
- Giganteum
