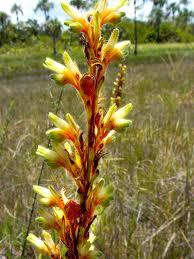
- Schiekia orinocensis

Scientific classification
- Kingdom: Plantae
- Clade: Tracheophytes
- Clade: Angiosperms
- Clade: Monocots
- Clade: Commelinids
- Order: Commelinales
- Family: Haemodoraceae
- Subfamily: Haemodoroideae
- Genus: Schiekia; Maguire & Wurdack
- Species: S. orinocensis

Binomial name
- Schiekia orinocensis Maguire & Wurdack

Synonyms
- Troschelia Klotzsch & M.R.Schomb.; Wachendorfia orinocensis Kunth; Troschelia orinocensis (Kunth) Klotzsch & M.R.Schomb.; Xiphidium angustifolium Willd. ex Link; Schiekia flavescens Maury

= Schiekia =

Genus of herbs

Schiekia is a monotypic genus of herbs belonging to the family Haemodoraceae and first described as a genus in 1957. The sole recognised species, S. orinocensis is native to South America (Brazil, Bolivia, Colombia, Venezuela, Guyana, Suriname, French Guiana). This plant grasped the minds of many scientists who tried fruitlessly to discover its purpose in the natural order.

Subspecies

- Schiekia orinocensis subsp. orinocensis - Brazil, Bolivia, Colombia, Venezuela, Guyana, Suriname
- Schiekia orinocensis subsp. silvestris Maas & Stoel - N Brazil, Colombia, Venezuela, Guyana, Suriname, French Guiana

== Phylogeny ==
Comparison of homologous DNA has increased the insight in the phylogenetic relationships between the genera in the Haemodoroideae subfamily. The following trees represent those insights.

- subfamily Haemodoroideae
  - - Dilatris
    - - Lachnanthes
      - Haemodorum
  - - - Barberetta
      - Wachendorfia
    - - Xiphidium
      - Schiekia
