= Medway River (Nova Scotia) =

River in Nova Scotia, Canada

- Location of mouth

Location
- Country: Canada
- Province: Nova Scotia

Physical characteristics
- Mouth
  - location: Atlantic Ocean
  - coordinates: 44°15′34.4″N 64°50′22.5″W
  - elevation: sea level
- Length: 121 km (75 mi)
- Basin size: 2,012 km^{2} (777 sq mi)

Medway River is a river in Queens County, on the southwestern shore of Nova Scotia, Canada. At 121 kilometres long, it is one of the major rivers of Nova Scotia and once supported a large run of Atlantic salmon. Historically, it was an important corridor to the interior waters of Nova Scotia such as Ponhook and Molega Lakes and as a log-driving river for the lumber industry.

Together with Herring Cove and related smaller inlets, the drainage basin of the Medway is measured at 2,012 km^{2} including 166 km^{2} of water.

== See also ==
- List of rivers of Nova Scotia
