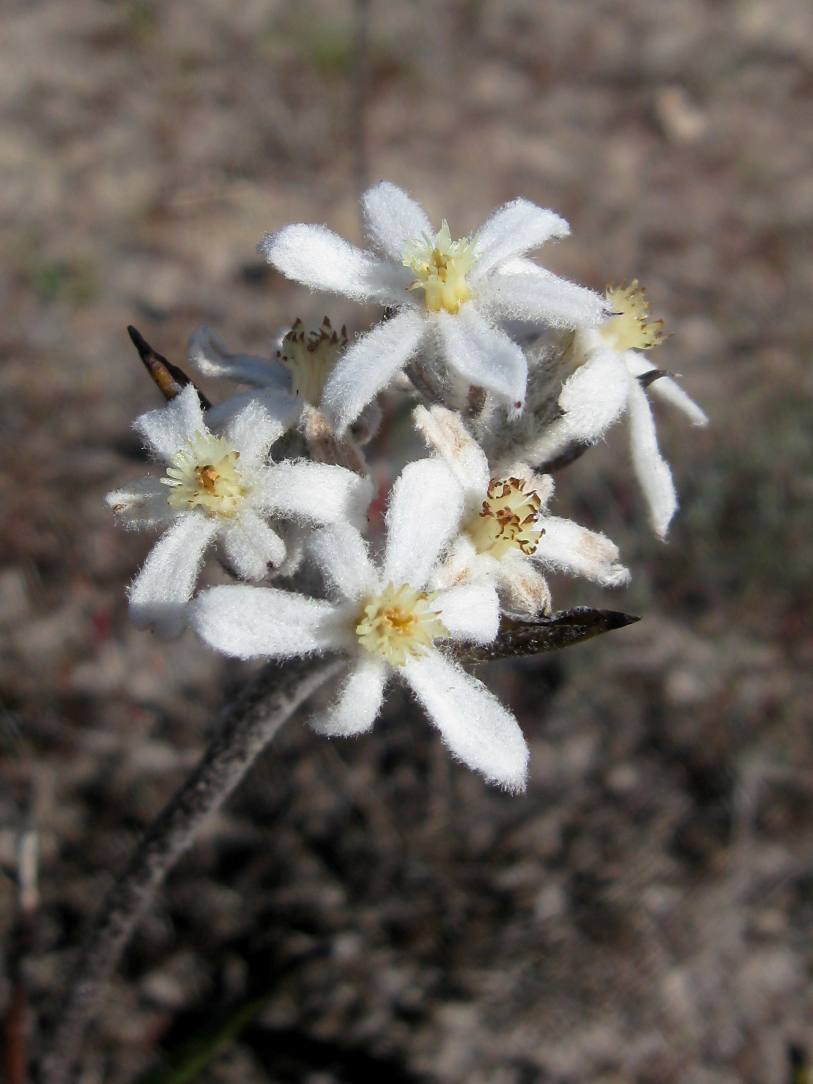

Scientific classification
- Kingdom: Plantae
- Clade: Tracheophytes
- Clade: Angiosperms
- Clade: Monocots
- Clade: Commelinids
- Order: Commelinales
- Family: Haemodoraceae
- Subfamily: Conostylidoideae
- Genus: Tribonanthes; Endl.

Type species
- Tribonanthes australis Endl.
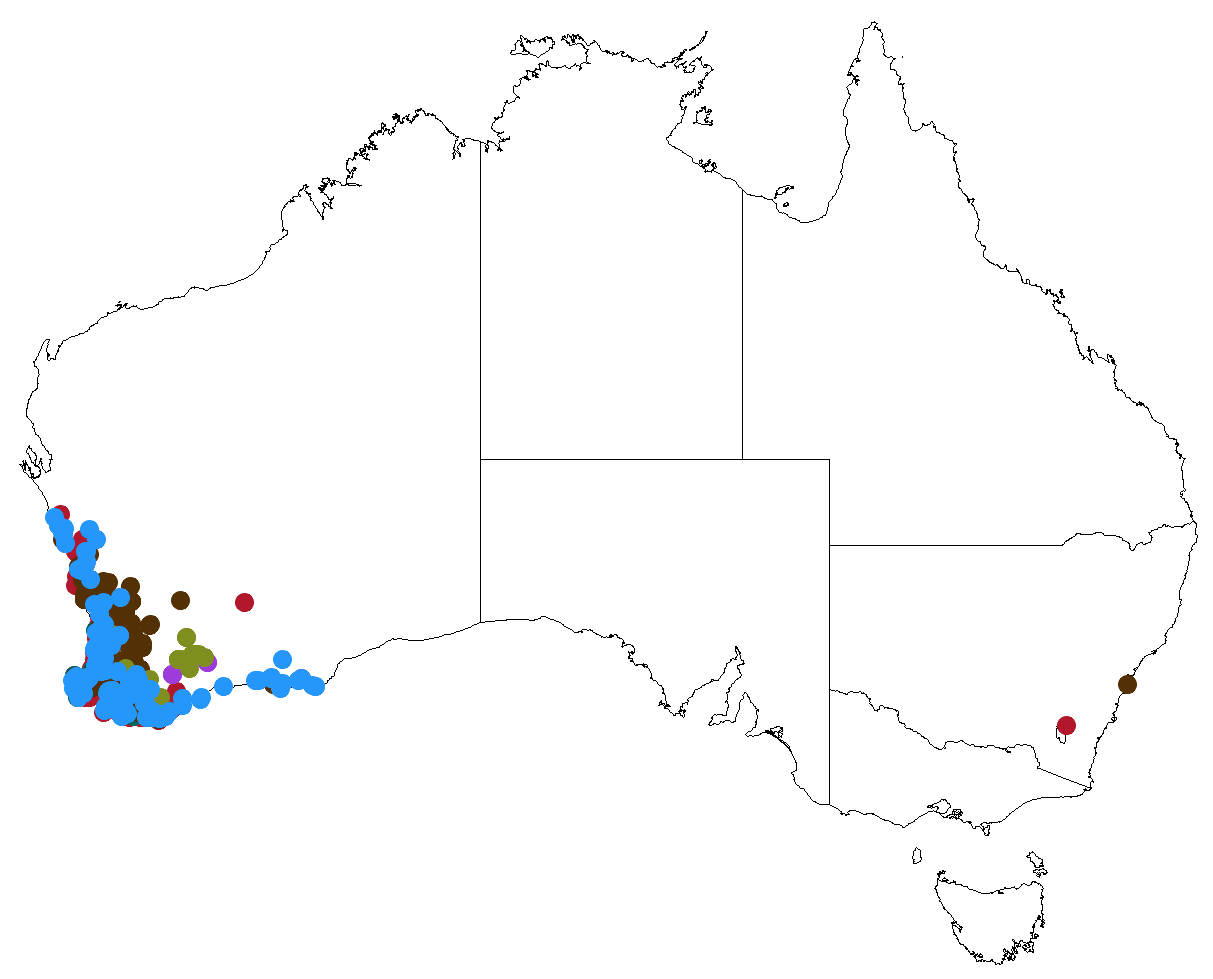
- Occurrence data from AVH

= Tribonanthes =

Genus of plants

Tribonanthes a genus of Australian plants endemic to Western Australia in the bloodwort family, Haemodoraceae.

== Species ==
The following species are recognised in the genus Tribonanthes:

- Tribonanthes australis Endl. - type species
- Tribonanthes brachypetala Lindl.
- Tribonanthes elongata E.J.Hickman & Hopper
- Tribonanthes keigheryi E.J.Hickman & Hopper
- Tribonanthes longipetala Lindl.
- Tribonanthes minor M.Lyons & Keighery
- Tribonanthes monantha E.J.Hickman & Hopper
- Tribonanthes porphyrea E.J.Hickman & Hopper
- Tribonanthes purpurea T.D.Macfarl. & Hopper
- Tribonanthes uniflora Lindl.
- Tribonanthes variabilis Lindl.
- Tribonanthes violacea Endl.
