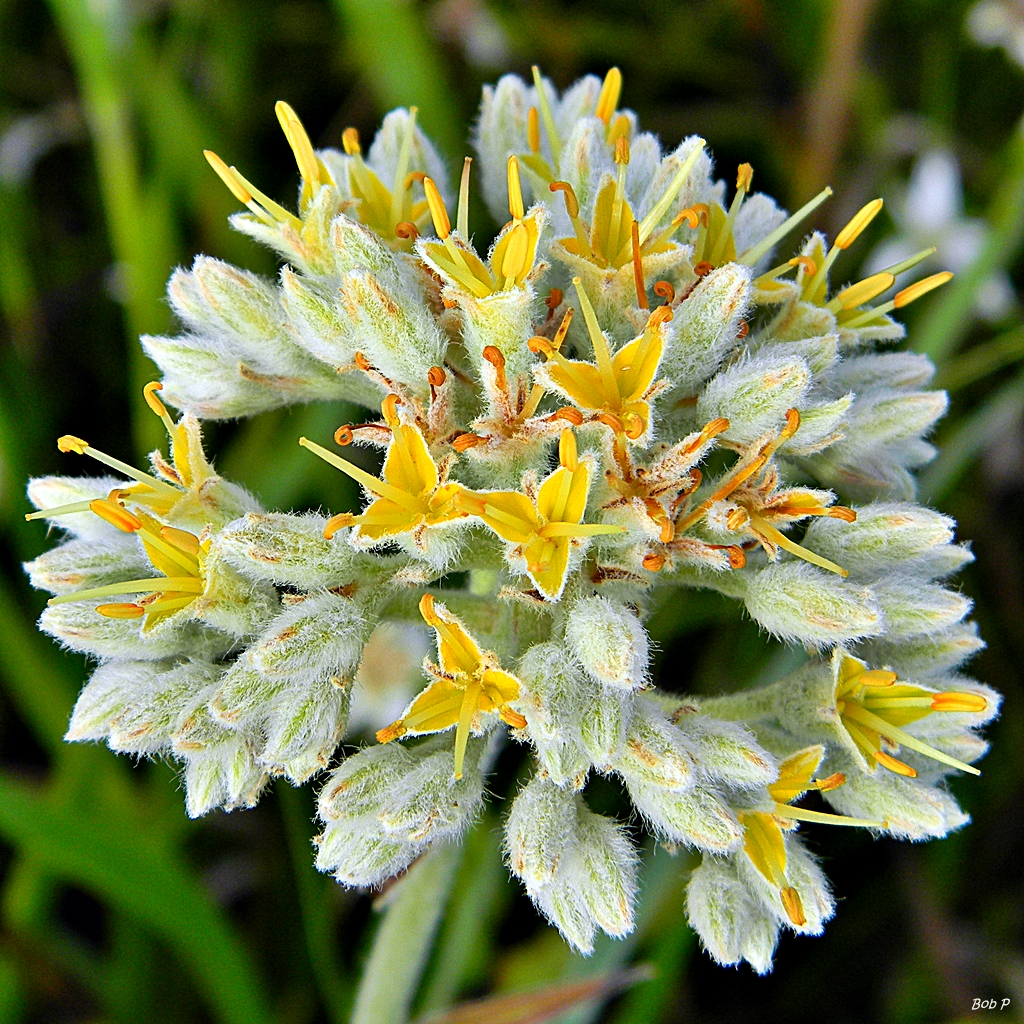
- Lachnanthes caroliana

Conservation status
- Secure (NatureServe)

Scientific classification
- Kingdom: Plantae
- Clade: Tracheophytes
- Clade: Angiosperms
- Clade: Monocots
- Clade: Commelinids
- Order: Commelinales
- Family: Haemodoraceae
- Subfamily: Haemodoroideae
- Genus: Lachnanthes; Ell.
- Species: L. caroliana

Binomial name
- Lachnanthes caroliana (Lam.) Dandy

Synonyms
- Anonymos tinctoria Walter; Dilatris caroliniana Lam.; Dilatris heritiera Pers.; Dilatris tinctoria (Walter ex J.F. Gmel.) Pursh; Gyrotheca tinctoria (Walter ex J.F. Gmel.) Salisb.; Heritiera gmelinii Michx.; Heritiera tinctorum Walter ex J.F. Gmel.; Lachnanthes tinctoria (Walter ex J.F. Gmel.) Elliott; Lachnanthes tinctoria var. major C. Wright ex Griseb.

= Lachnanthes =

Genus of flowering plants

Lachnanthes is a genus of monocotyledonous plants in the bloodwort family containing only one species, i.e., Lachnanthes caroliana (caroliniana), commonly known as Carolina redroot or bloodroot. The plant is native to eastern North America, from southeastern Nova Scotia (especially the Molega Lake area) and Massachusetts in the north, south to Florida and Cuba, and west along the Gulf of Mexico to Louisiana. It has also been reported from an island in the western Caribbean off the coast of Honduras. It prefers wet, acidic, usually sandy soils, restricting it to various wetland habitats such as bogs, pinelands, hammocks and pocosins, among others.

The plant's common name is based on its red roots and rhizomes. Its flowers, consisting of six pale yellow tepals, emerge from mid to late summer. The plant is sometimes a significant weed in commercial cranberry bogs.

== Taxonomy ==
The generic name "Lachnanthes" is a conserved name in botany. This means that the name has been granted a special exemption to the ordinary priority rules, allowing a newer name to be used instead of an older one. Three names are relevant here:

- Heritiera Aiton, Hortus Kewensis 3: 546. 1789.
- Heritiera J.F. Gmelin, Systema Naturae, ed. 13 2: 113. 1791.
- Lachnanthes S. Elliott, Sketch of the Botany of South-Carolina and Georgia 1: 47. 1816.

The first is a different plant, a tropical tree. This makes the second name an illegitimate homonym, unusable. The conservation decree allows the third name to be used in place of the second to refer to the plant now called Lachnanthes caroliana.

== Phylogeny ==
Comparison of homologous DNA has increased the insight in the phylogenetic relationships between the genera in the Haemodoroideae subfamily. The following trees represent those insights.

- subfamily Haemodoroideae
  - - - Lachnanthes
      - Haemodorum
    - Dilatris
  - - - Xiphidium
      - Schiekia
    - - Wachendorfia
      - Barberetta
