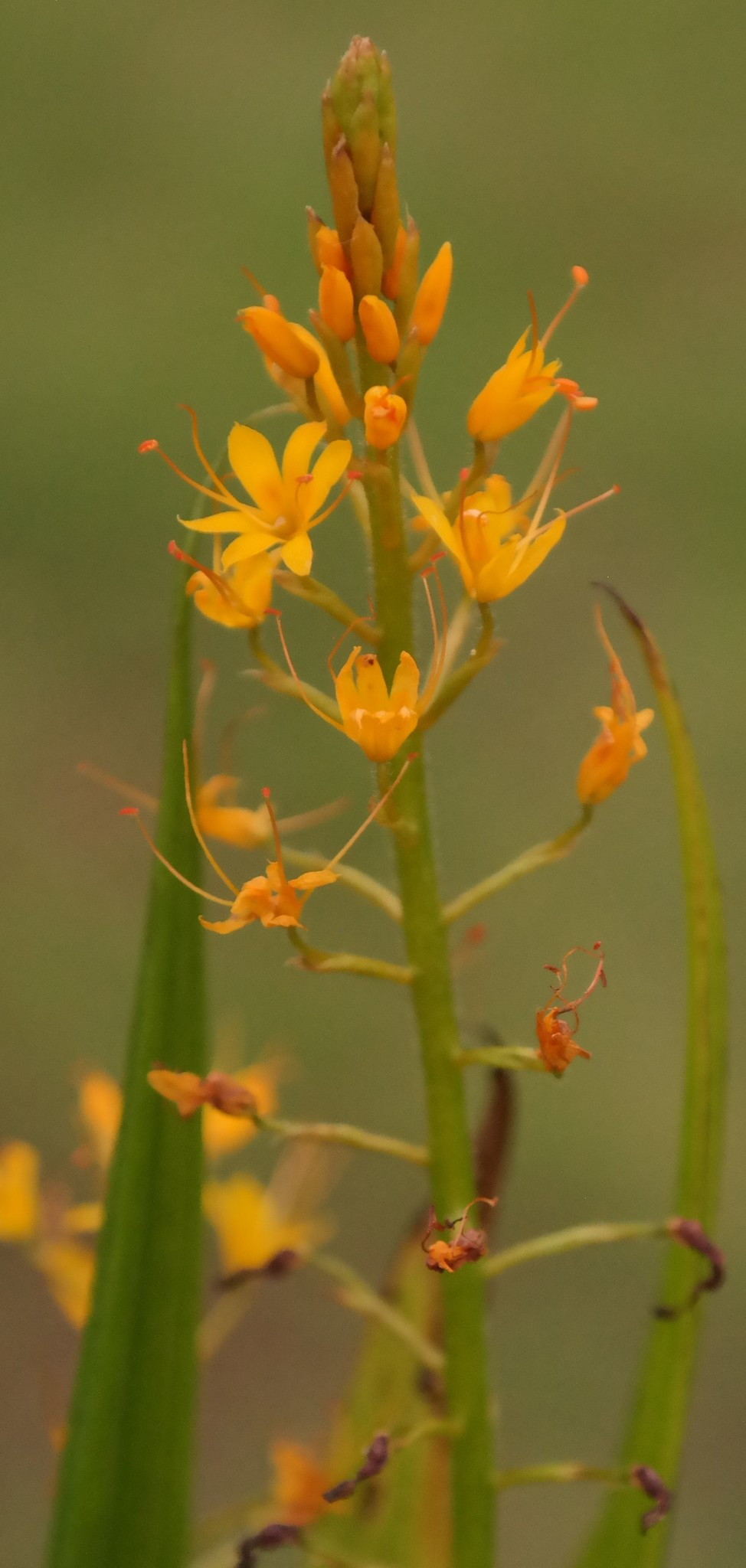

Scientific classification
- Kingdom: Plantae
- Clade: Embryophytes
- Clade: Tracheophytes
- Clade: Angiosperms
- Clade: Monocots
- Clade: Commelinids
- Order: Commelinales
- Family: Haemodoraceae
- Subfamily: Haemodoroideae
- Genus: Barberetta; Harv.
- Species: B. aurea

Binomial name
- Barberetta aurea Harv.

= Barberetta =

Genus of flowering plants

Barberetta is a genus of herbaceous perennial plants in the family Haemodoraceae. It contains only one known species, Barberetta aurea.

== Description ==
Barberetta aurea grows to up to 30 cm (12 in) high from a tuberous rootstock and develops about 3 leaves that are arranged like a fan, flattened sideways and so creating a left and right surface rather than an upper and lower surface. The leaves lack a leafstalk, are lance-shaped in outline, hairless, up to 35 cm (1.15 ft) long and 0.6–2 cm (0.24–0.79 in) wide at midlength, narrowing gradually to the foot and the tip, and have five distinct vertical ribs and several finer ribs in between. The stem is weak, 15–30 cm (0.49–0.98 ft) long, with some hairs towards the top, and carries its many flowers in a simple raceme, of 5–7.5 cm (2.0–3.0 in) long. The stalks of the individual flower are inclined upwards, the lower flower stalks are 1.3–2 cm (0.51–0.79 in) long. Wrapped around the foot of each flower stalk is a persistent lance-shaped bract of up to 5 mm (0.20 in) long. The star-symmetric perianth consists of six tepals of about 7 mm (0.28 in) long and 4 mm (0.16 in) wide, that are yolk yellow when fresh and bright orange when dry. The upper three tepals have an orange spot at their base. The stamens are approximately 7 mm (0.28 in) long. The two upper filaments ascend and slightly diverge, while the lower filament diverges strongly in the direction opposite to the style. The filaments are yellow and carry very short, orange, elliptic anthers. The ovary is green in colour and about 2 mm (0.079 in) in diameter and contains one ovule of approximately 1 mm (0.039 in) in diameter. The ovary is a yellow style of 6–7 m (240–280 in)m long that is strongly bent sideways and carries an orange coloured stigma. The ovary develops into an initially yellow, later blackish half egg-shaped capsule of about 4 m (160 in) across that contains a single orange finely papillous seed of around 3 mm (0.12 in). The sap of this plant stains paper red. Barberetta aurea has a base chromosome count of 15 (n=15). Small corms grow in the axils of the bracts that are responsible for vegetative reproduction.

== Taxonomy ==
Barberetta aurea was described in 1868 by William Henry Harvey. The genus Barberetta is named in recognition of a Mrs. Barber who collected this plant for science. Aurea is a Latin word meaning "golden".

Comparison of homologous DNA has increased the insight in the phylogenetic relationships between the genera in the Haemodoroideae subfamily. The following tree represents those insights.

- subfamily Haemodoroideae
  - - Dilatris
    - - Lachnanthes
      - Haemodorum
  - - - Xiphidium
      - Schiekia
    - - Wachendorfia
      - Barberetta

== Distribution, ecology and conservation ==
Barberetta aurea is endemic to South Africa (Eastern Cape province and KwaZulu-Natal). Like in the species of the closely related genus Wachendorfia, two types of individuals occur, plants with only flowers with the style curved to the left and plants with flowers with the style curved to the right, and these are both present within the same populations. This so-called floral enantiomorphy is thought to be a mechanism to increase outcrossing and so boost genetic diversity. The species grows in moist and shaded locations. Barberetta aurea is considered a least-concern species.
