= Tricarpelema africanum =

Conservation status
- Vulnerable (IUCN 2.3)

Scientific classification
- Kingdom: Plantae
- Clade: Tracheophytes
- Clade: Angiosperms
- Clade: Monocots
- Clade: Commelinids
- Order: Commelinales
- Family: Commelinaceae
- Genus: Tricarpelema
- Species: T. africanum

Binomial name
- Tricarpelema africanum Faden

Species of plant

Tricarpelema africanum is a monocotyledonous flowering plant in the family Commelinaceae. It is native to west-central Africa and is typically found growing in shallow soils on inselbergs. The species is the only member of its genus not found in the moist forests of tropical Asia and the only species of the subgenus Keatingia. Tricarpelema africanum's physical separation from its Asian relatives has led it to evolve a number of unique morphological features, most of which are vegetative adaptations to drier conditions.
