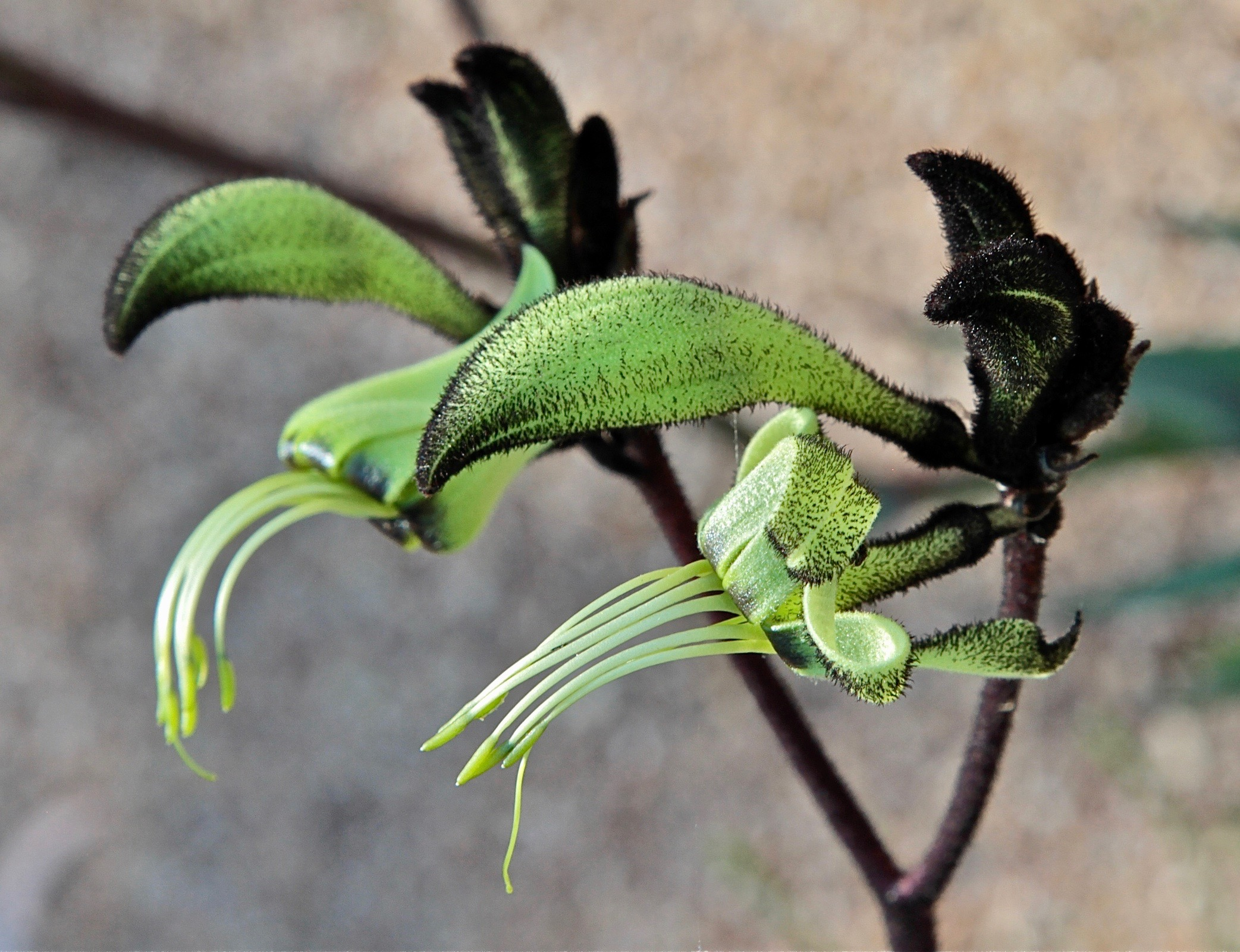
- Macropidia fuliginosa

Scientific classification
- Kingdom: Plantae
- Clade: Tracheophytes
- Clade: Angiosperms
- Clade: Monocots
- Clade: Commelinids
- Order: Commelinales
- Family: Haemodoraceae
- Subfamily: Conostylidoideae
- Genus: Macropidia; J.Drumm. ex Harv.
- Species: M. fuliginosa

Binomial name
- Macropidia fuliginosa (Hook.) Druce

= Macropidia =

Genus of flowering plants

Macropidia fuliginosa, the sole species of genus Macropidia, is a perennial rhizomatous flowering plant. A relation of the kangaroo paws, Anigozanthos, which are also endemic to Southwest Australia, it is referred to as the black kangaroo paw. Bearing unusual black and green flowers, it occurs on a coastal plain from Perth to Geraldton.

== Taxonomy ==
A species of the Haemodoraceae family, once allied to the kangaroo paws Anigozanthos, but recognised as a separate and monotypic sister genus named Macropidia. It was first described by James Drummond in a letter intended for publication in 1843, and named as "Anigozanthos Molloyiae". Drummond wrote of this species as a flower of mourning, and provided the epithet in reference to the recently deceased Georgiana Molloy, an early botanical collector of the region. The first published description by W. J. Hooker in the Botanical Magazine provided the name Anigozanthos fuliginosa in 1847, but its later separation by Drummond and William Henry Harvey to a new genus in 1855 used Macropidia fumosa. The erection of a new genus followed a visit by Hooker to the Swan River colony in 1854, the region in which Drummond lived and collected. The priority of the Hooker's earlier epithet was recognised by G. C. Druce, who established its revision as the current name Macropidia fuliginosa in 1917.

The type locality is not certain, and while once thought to have been collected in the Hill River region, Stephen Hopper gave the location as "near Moore River" in the Flora of Australia. The collection was made by Johnston Drummond in 1843, probably close to the site where he was killed two years later; Rica Erickson identified a possible site near New Norcia and determined that he did not habitually visit the Hill river region.

The name kangaroo paw is given for the flowering branches resemblance to a kangaroo's forearm. The 'black' species is contained by a monotypic genus, eleven other similar plants of this name are contained by the genus Anigozanthos. The generic name Macropidia refers to the kangaroo genus Macropus; fuliginosa is from the Latin for soot (fuligo) referring to the black colouration. The description of the species in the Botanical Magazine in 1847, then known only from dried specimens, gave the common name sooty anigozanthos.

"Nollamara" is the Aboriginal word for the black kangaroo paw, a name given to a suburb of Perth.

== Description ==
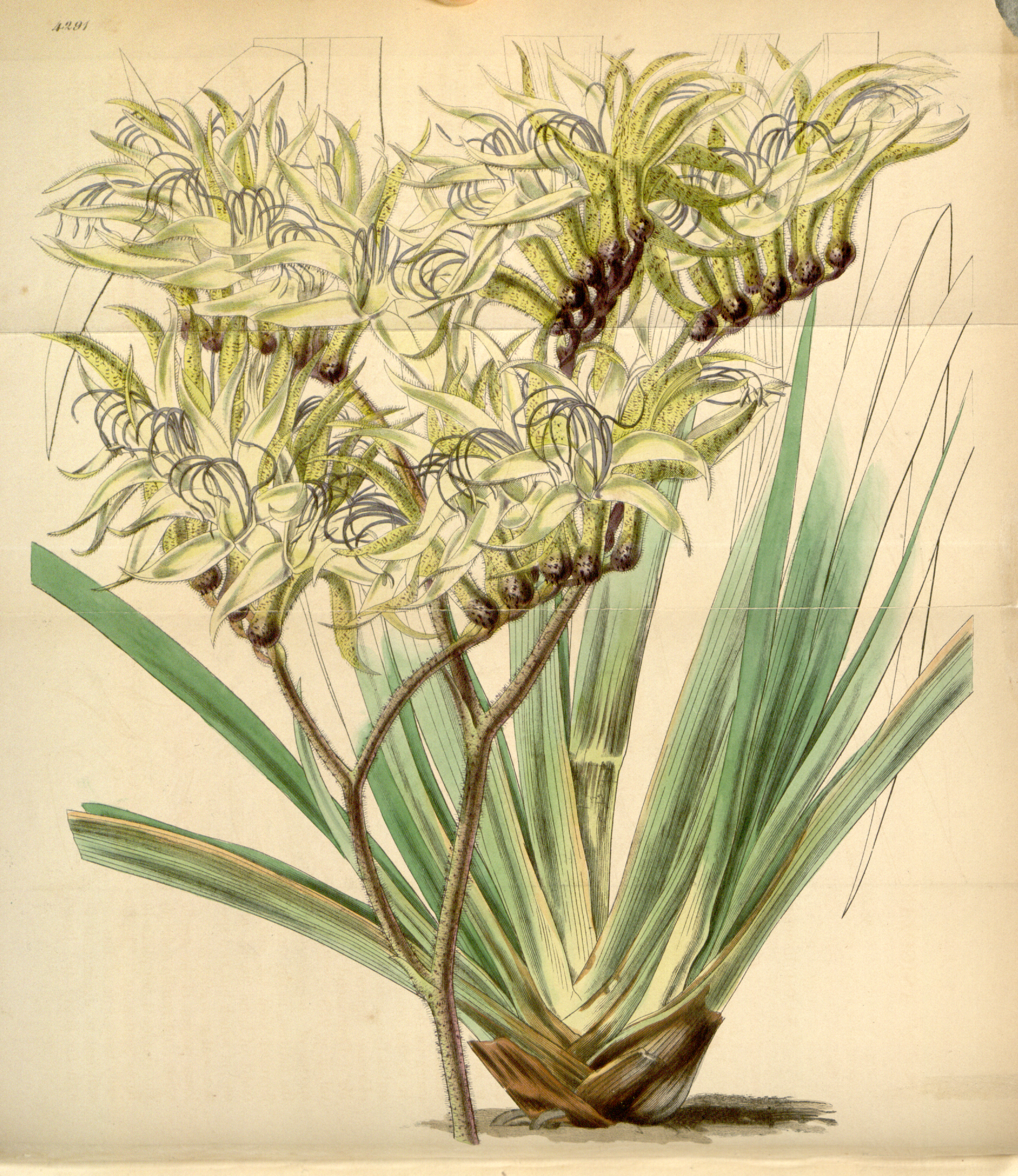
"Sooty Anigozanthos" - the Botanical Magazine, plate 4317

A small perennial herb with erect green-yellow leaves, its flowering scape is around one metre in height. The leaves are strap-like, flattened, and between 315 and 460 mm long, 10 to 15 mm wide, and tightly arrayed at ground level. They emerge from a stem beneath the ground, a rhizome, that allows the plants to regenerate after fire. Flowers occur in spring and summer on branched stem to a metre or more. Black hairs occur along the flowers and stems.

The black and green color of the inflorescence is unusual in Australian plants, where it is only present in a few species of grevillea and another south-western species, Kennedia nigricans (black kennedia). The perianth curves back in an irregular form, leaving a tube between 12 and 18 mm long; the total length of this is 50 to 60 mm.

Macropidia fuliginosa can be germinated from seed for cultivation, but with difficulty, commercial production instead uses tissue culture as a means of propagation. It is not as widely propagated as the kangaroos paws of Anigozanthos , whose species are hardier and more successfully cultivated.

It is classified as 'not threatened', within the Western Australian Flora Conservation Taxa.

== Distribution ==
Macropidia fuliginosa is found in a distribution range extending north from Muchea to Walkaway, favouring low mallee and heath vegetation on white or lateritic sand of the Southwest Australia bioregion. The population is uncommon and widely dispersed, usually occurring as isolated individuals instead of several plants growing together in a clump.

== Ecology ==
It is pollinated by nectar feeding birds, those observed are the Meliphagidae (honeyeater) species, the tawny-crowned Gliciphila melanops, singing Gavicalis virescens, brown Lichmera indistincta, and white-cheeked honeyeater Phylidonyris niger.

== Cultivation ==
When affected by disease it can be burned back to the ground and will regrow from the rhizome. Like many Australian natives it can withstand bushfire in the wild. It is subject to fungal diseases such as the ink-spot fungus, and the rust fungus Puccinia haemodora.

The plant is difficult to propagate from seed, and usually cultivated by tissue culture.
