= Tricarpelema =

Scientific classification
- Kingdom: Plantae
- Clade: Embryophytes
- Clade: Tracheophytes
- Clade: Spermatophytes
- Clade: Angiosperms
- Clade: Monocots
- Clade: Commelinids
- Order: Commelinales
- Family: Commelinaceae
- Subfamily: Commelinoideae
- Tribe: Commelineae
- Genus: Tricarpelema; J.K.Morton

Type species
- Tricarpelema giganteum (Hassk.) H.Hara

Genus of plants

Tricarpelema is a genus of monocotyledonous flowering plants in the family Commelinaceae consisting of 8 species. The genus is divided into two subgenera, subgenus Tricarpelema, which includes 7 known species found in tropical Asia, and subgenus Keatingia with one species in western Africa. The Asian species are typically found in the forest understory while the single African species has evolved to drier, sunnier conditions and is usually associated with inselbergs.

== Taxonomy ==
The genus Tricarpelema was created in 1966 by Kevin Cousins when he found that a Himalayan species then known as Aneilema thomsonii could not be satisfactorily classified within Aneilema nor the related genus Dictyospermum. He placed this species in the new genus as Tricarpelema giganteum. D.Y. Hong added two species to the new genus, namely T. chinense and T. xizangenese, in 1974 and 1981 respectively. Meanwhile, in a 1975 Ph.D. thesis, Robert Faden treated Tricarpelema as a subgenus of the closely related genus Dictyospermum, while in 1980 R.S. Rao added another Indian species to the genus, namely T. glanduliferum. By 1991 Faden had recognised the genus as distinct and added yet another species to it, this time T. philippense. He and J. Cowley published a sixth species in 1996, T. pumilum, which is endemic to Borneo. Two years later Faden recognised a seventh undescribed species from Vietnam and also commented on an African plant that could be an eighth species. In 2007 both of these were described with the Vietnamese species being named T. brevipedicellatum and the African species T. africanum. As the African species differs from the Asian taxa in a number of important morphological features as well as in habitat, Faden assigned it to a new subgenus Keatingia.

The taxonomic boundaries of some species are not completely understood, mainly due to a lack of herbarium specimens. For example, both T. brevipedicellatum and T. glanduliferum are each known from only two collections. A number of undescribed species are also likely to remain. For example, plants of T. philippense growing on Borneo are known to be larger than those in the Philippines, yet further differences have not been examined. Additionally, a single specimen collected from Burma shows characters that do not agree with any of the described species and likely represents a new species. Two more specimens, also from Burma, are distinct from the aforemetined specimen, but may represent a more southern distribution of the Chinese species. Robert Faden notes that further collections from Burma are necessary to better understand the genus in that country.

== Distribution and habitat ==
Tricarpelema has its centre of diversity in tropical Asia. The genus can be found there from Bhutan and eastern India, west to Vietnam, southern China, and the Philippines, and south to Malaysia, Brunei, and Indonesia. Many of the species from Asia have poorly understood distributions due to limited numbers of specimens. For example, three species in the genus are known from six collections or less. A single species occurs in western-central Africa in Cameroon, Equatorial Guinea, and Gabon. This disjunctive distribution is found in a number of other genera, such as Amischotolype and Calamus, each of which has a relatively low number of species in west-central Africa and many more in tropical Asia.

Habitat information for most of the Asian species is poor, but most are known to be forest understory plants, often in moist situations. The African species, T. africanum, on the other hand, is found in relatively dry areas, often in full sun. It is also strongly associated with inselbergs. Robert Faden suggests that T. africanum may have adapted to drier conditions from members of the genus once found in African rainforests which later died out in response to prehistoric aridification of Africa.

Species

- Tricarpelema africanum Faden - Cameroon, Gabon, Equatorial Guinea
- Tricarpelema brevipedicellatum Faden - Vietnam
- Tricarpelema chinense D.Y.Hong - Arunachal Pradesh, Sichuan, Myanmar
- Tricarpelema giganteum (Hassk.) H.Hara - Assam, Bhutan, Arunachal Pradesh
- Tricarpelema glanduliferum (J.Joseph & R.S.Rao) R.S.Rao - Arunachal Pradesh, Vietnam
- Tricarpelema philippense (Panigrahi) Faden - Philippines, Borneo, Sumatra
- Tricarpelema pumilum (Hallier f.) Faden - Borneo
- Tricarpelema xizangense D.Y.Hong - Tibet
