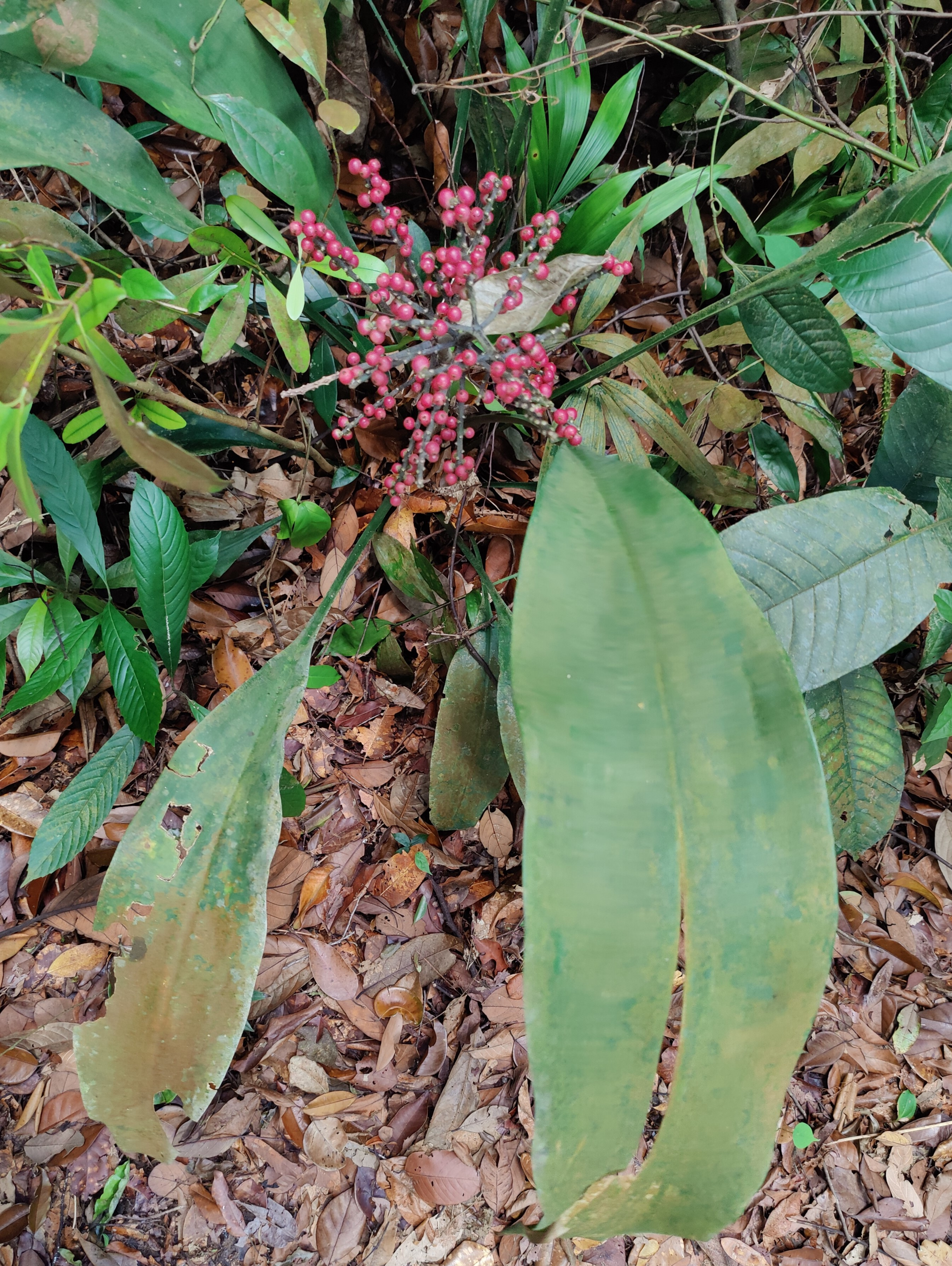
- Hanguana rubinea, fruiting

Scientific classification
- Kingdom: Plantae
- Clade: Tracheophytes
- Clade: Angiosperms
- Clade: Monocots
- Clade: Commelinids
- Order: Commelinales
- Family: Hanguanaceae; Airy Shaw
- Genus: Hanguana; Blume

Type species
- Hanguana kassintu Blume

Synonyms
- Susum Blume; Veratronia Miq.

= Hanguana =

Genus of flowering plants

Hanguana is a genus of flowering plants with a dozen known species. It is the only genus in the family Hanguanaceae.

The APG IV system of 2016 recognizes such a family and places it in the order Commelinales, in the clade commelinids, in the monocots (unchanged from the APG III system of 2009 and the APG II system of 2003. This represents a slight change from the APG system, of 1998, which left Hanguanaceae unplaced as to order, but assigned it to these same clades (although it used the name commelinoids). The family consists of only very few species of perennial, tropical plants in Sri Lanka, Southeast Asia, New Guinea, Micronesia, and northern Australia.

Species currently accepted (August 2014):

- Hanguana bakoensis Siti Nurfazilah, Sofiman Othman & P.C.Boyce - Sarawak
- Hanguana bogneri Tillich & E.Sill - Sarawak
- Hanguana exultans Siti Nurfazilah, Mohd Fahmi, Sofiman Othman & P.C.Boyce - Peninsular Malaysia
- Hanguana kassintu Blume - Java
- Hanguana loi Mohd Fahmi, Sofiman Othman & P.C.Boyce - Sarawak
- Hanguana major Airy Shaw - Sarawak, Sabah
- Hanguana malayana (Jack) Merr. - Sri Lanka, Myanmar, Thailand, Vietnam, Peninsular Malaysia, Borneo, Java, Sumatra, Sulawesi, Philippines, New Guinea, Queensland, Northern Territory, Palau. Bakong (Hanguana malayana) is abundant in Laguna de Cagayan's agricultural wasteland, specifically in Santa Teresita, Cagayan, Mindoro, Palawan, Lanao del Sur, Agusan del Sur, and Surigao. The aquatic plant grows to three meters and is used to make pulp, yarn, bioplastics, textile, clothing, accessories, furniture and paper handicrafts.
- Hanguana neglecta ? - Malaya
- Hanguana nitens Siti Nurfazilah, Mohd Fahmi, Sofiman Othman & P.C.Boyce - Peninsular Malaysia
- Hanguana pantiensis Siti Nurfazilah, Mohd Fahmi, Sofiman Othman & P.C.Boyce - Peninsular Malaysia
- Hanguana podzolica Siti Nurfazilah, Mohd Fahmi, Sofiman Othman & P.C.Boyce - Peninsular Malaysia
- Hanguana rubinea Škorničk. & P.C.Boyce - Singapore
- Hanguana stenopoda Siti Nurfazilah, Mohd Fahmi, Sofiman Othman & P.C.Boyce - Peninsular Malaysia
- Hanguana triangulata Škorničk. & P.C.Boyce - Singapore
