= Tricarpelema philippense =

Scientific classification
- Kingdom: Plantae
- Clade: Embryophytes
- Clade: Tracheophytes
- Clade: Spermatophytes
- Clade: Angiosperms
- Clade: Monocots
- Clade: Commelinids
- Order: Commelinales
- Family: Commelinaceae
- Genus: Tricarpelema
- Species: T. philippense

Binomial name
- Tricarpelema philippense (Panigrahi) Faden

Species of plant

Tricarpelema philippense is a monocotyledonous herbaceous plant in the family Commelinaceae. It occurs in maritime Southeast Asia in the Philippines, Malaysia, and Indonesia.

== Distribution and habitat ==
Tricarpelema philippense occurs in maritime Southeast Asia in the countries of the Philippines, Malaysia, and Indonesia. Within the Philippines it has been collected in the provinces of Quezon, Cebu, and on the island of Luzon. In Malaysia the plant is known from the country's two states on the island of Borneo, namely Sabah and Sarawak, while the Indonesian populations are also confined to that country's portion of Borneo, Kalimantan.
