= Tricarpelema giganteum =

Scientific classification
- Kingdom: Plantae
- Clade: Tracheophytes
- Clade: Angiosperms
- Clade: Monocots
- Clade: Commelinids
- Order: Commelinales
- Family: Commelinaceae
- Genus: Tricarpelema
- Species: T. giganteum

Binomial name
- Tricarpelema giganteum (Hasskarl) H.Hara

Species of plant

Tricarpelema giganteum is a monocotyledonous herbaceous plant in the family Commelinaceae. It is native to eastern India and Bhutan. Tricarpelema giganteum serves as the type species for the genus.
