= Cubanicula =

Scientific classification
- Kingdom: Plantae
- Clade: Tracheophytes
- Clade: Angiosperms
- Clade: Monocots
- Clade: Commelinids
- Order: Commelinales
- Family: Haemodoraceae
- Genus: Cubanicula; Hopper, J.E.Gut., E.J.Hickman, M.Pell. & Rhian J.Sm. (2020)
- Species: C. xanthorrhizos

Binomial name
- Cubanicula xanthorrhizos (C.Wright ex Griseb.) Hopper, J.E.Gut., E.J.Hickman, M.Pell. & Rhian J.Sm. (2020)

Synonyms
- Xiphidium xanthorrhizon C.Wright ex Griseb. (1866)

Genus of flowering plants

Cubanicula xanthorrhizos is a species of flowering plant in the family Haemodoraceae. It is the sole species in genus Cubanicula. It is a perennial native to western Cuba, including the Isle of Youth.
