= Molega Lake =

- Location within Nova Scotia
- Location: Queens County, Nova Scotia, Canada
- Coordinates: 44°19′57.68″N 64°53′56.35″W
- Type: lake

Molega Lake is a large lake in Queens County, Nova Scotia approximately 30 minutes outside of Bridgewater. The surrounding area is a mainly seasonal cottage area called Molega Lake Park with some year round residential subdivisions. The place around the lake is also known as place with land with high percentage of gold.

== Conservation ==
The lake is home to numerous endangered species, some which are completely contained within the vicinity of the lake. Included are the eastern ribbon snake, which is the only location of a sizable population of the snake east of Quebec. Molega Lake and Kejimkujik National Park are also home to the endangered Blanding's turtle which nest around the park and which is federally protected under the Species at Risk Act.

The lake is also home to the Knox Conservation Lands, an area donated to the Nova Scotia Nature Trust in order to permanently preserve a section of the lakes ecosystem. The Knox Conservation Lands are home to the only known habitat in Canada for Lachnanthes (Carolina redroot) and the first formally protected habitat of the above-mentioned eastern ribbon snake.

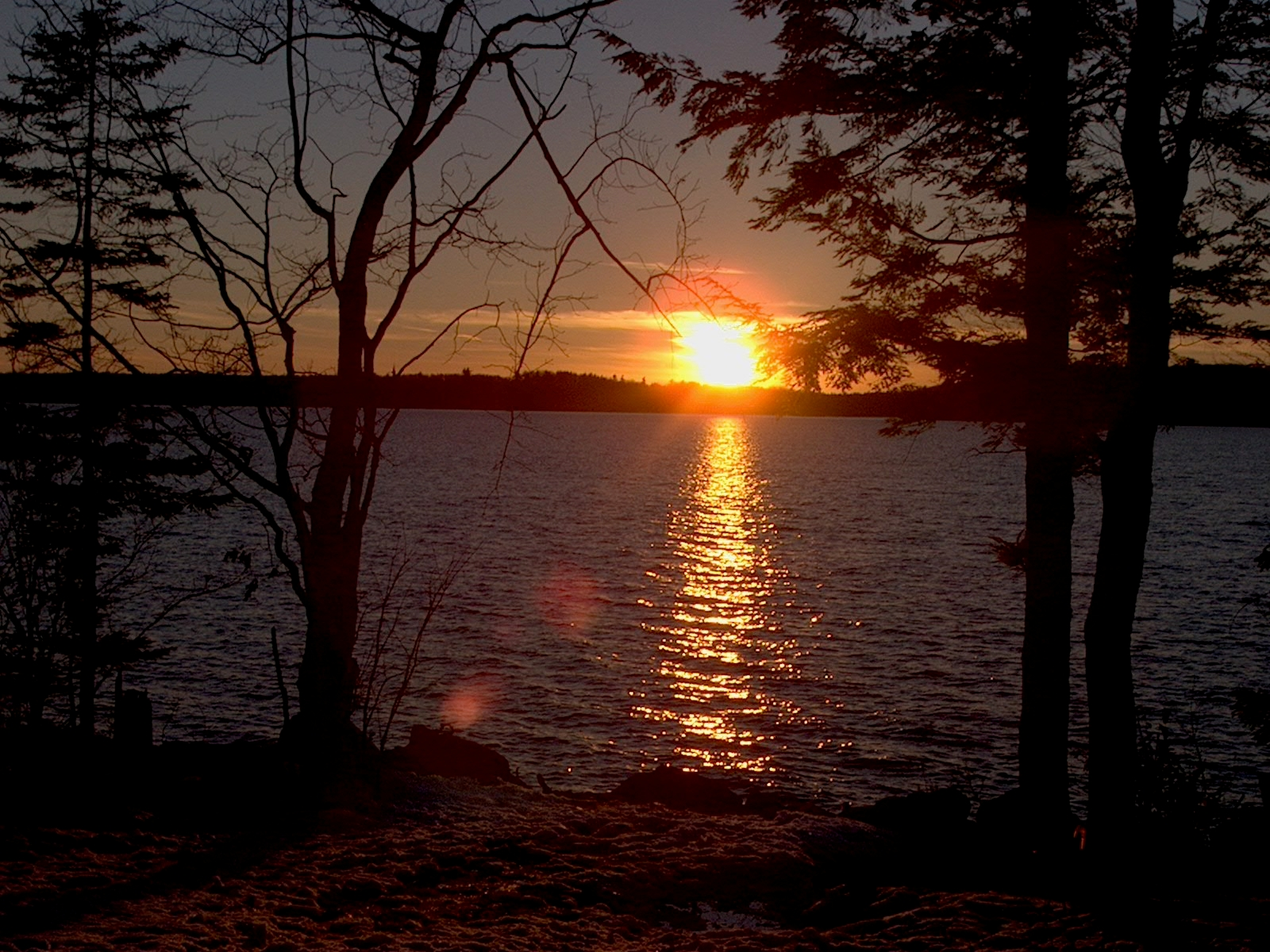
Sunset on Molega

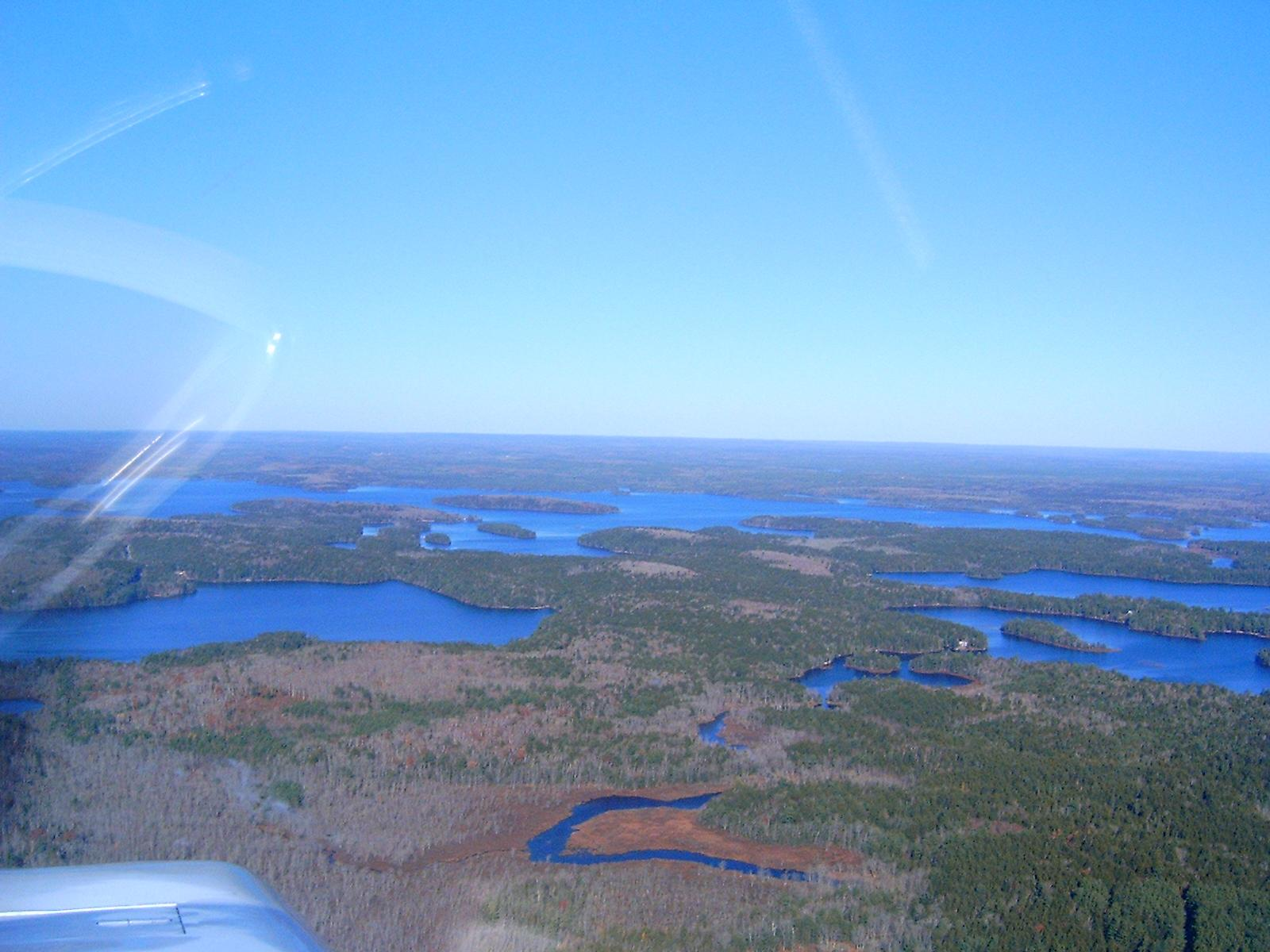
Molega/Ponhook Lakes Watershed
