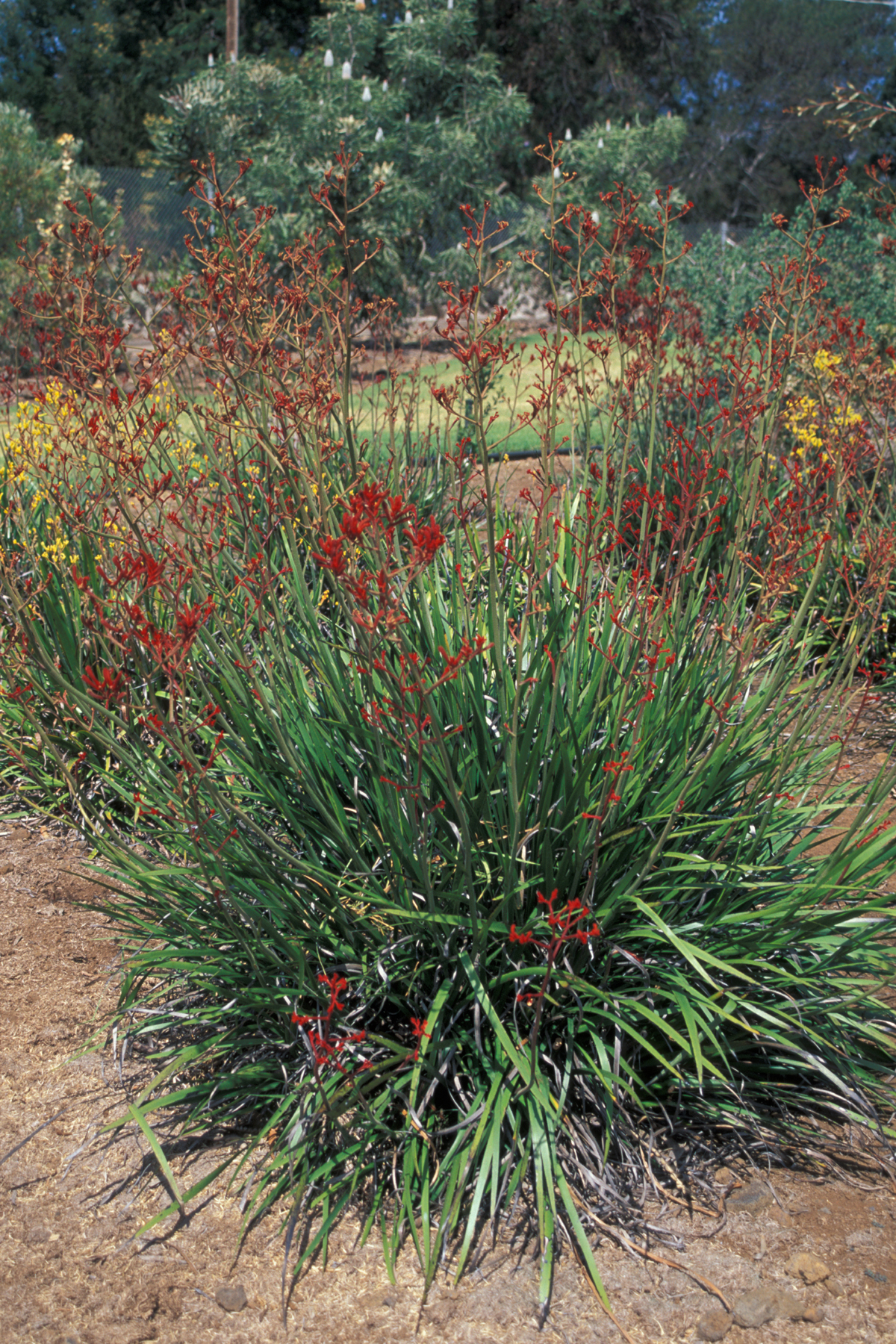
- Kangaroo paw (Anigozanthos flavidus)

Scientific classification
- Kingdom: Plantae
- Clade: Tracheophytes
- Clade: Angiosperms
- Clade: Monocots
- Clade: Commelinids
- Order: Commelinales
- Family: Haemodoraceae; R.Br. (1810) nom. cons.

Genera
- 15; see text

Synonyms
- Haemodoreae

= Haemodoraceae =

Family of flowering plants

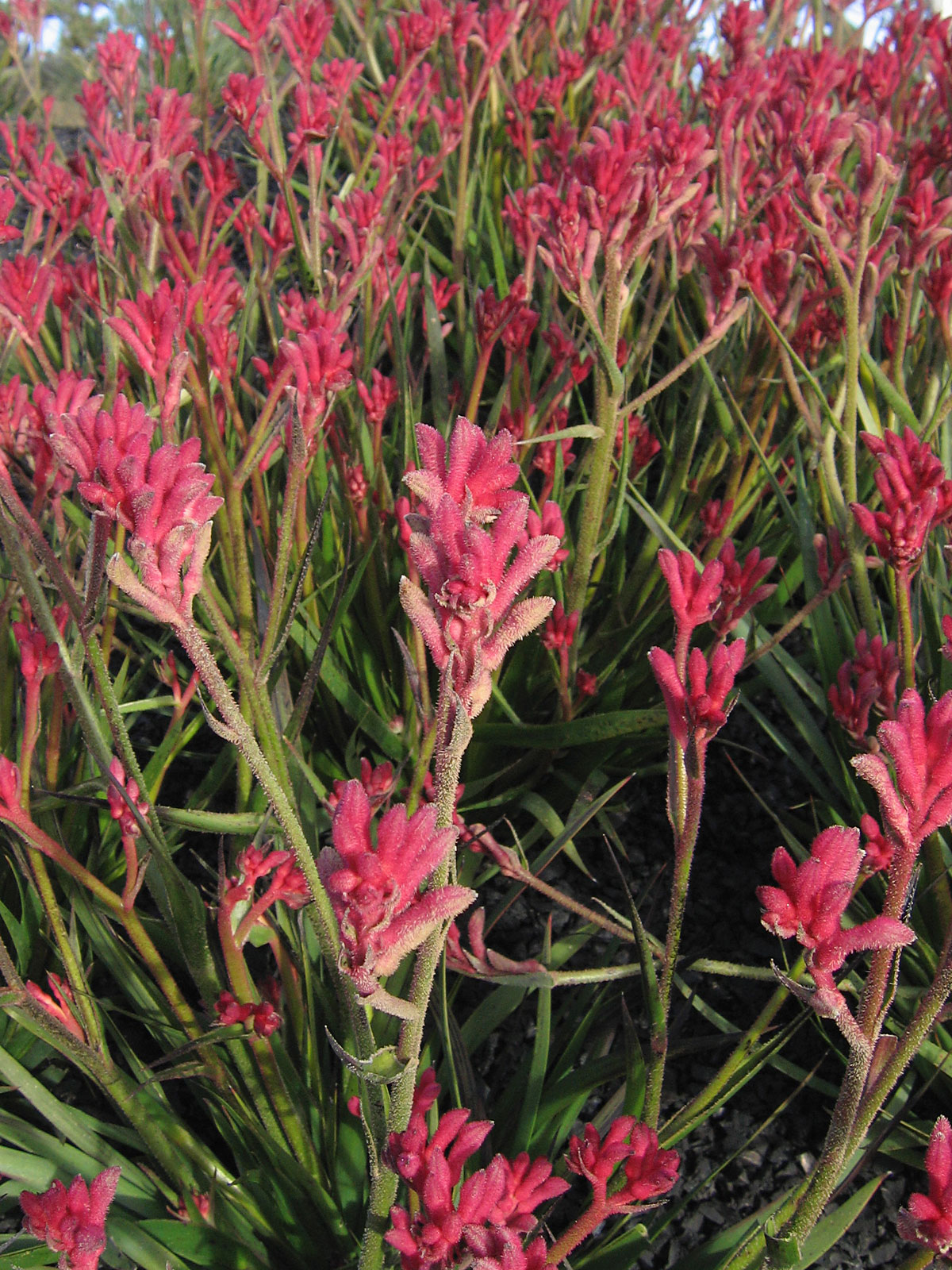
Anigozanthos Bush Pearl. Royal Botanic Gardens, Cranbourne.

Haemodoraceae is a family of perennial herbaceous angiosperms (flowering plants) containing 15 genera and 102 known species, sometimes known as the "bloodroots", found throughout the Southern Hemisphere, from Australia and New Guinea to South Africa, as well as the Americas (from extreme southeastern USA through tropical South America).

Perhaps the best-known (and most popular in cultivation) genera from the family are the unusual Anigozanthos and Macropidia, both commonly called "kangaroo-paw" or "kangaroo's paw" due to their fuzzy flowers. These genera are hugely popular in both private gardens and public landscaping projects in Mediterranean climate regions, such as in Chile, northwestern Mexico (Baja California), Southern California (and the Bay Area) and Western Australia, among other locations; the kangaroo-paws are valued for their hardiness, adaptability and low irrigation requirements, once established.

== Taxonomy ==
The Haemodoraceae were first described by Robert Brown in 1810, and bear his name as the botanical authority. An alternative name has been Haemodoreae

The fourth Angiosperm Phylogeny Group classification of 2016 (unchanged from the earlier APG systems of 2009, 2003 and 1998), also recognizes this family and places it in the order Commelinales, in the clade commelinids, in the monocots. The family of the Haemodoraceae then includes about sixteen sub-tropical or tropical genera found in the southern hemisphere, two in North America and three known cultivated genera in Europe.

- Haemodoraceae
  - Conostylidoideae
    - - - - Blancoa
          - Conostylis
        - Phlebocarya
      - - Macropidia
        - Anigozanthos
    - Tribonanthes
  - Haemodoroideae
    - - Dilatris
      - - Haemodorum
        - Lachnanthes
    - - - Barberetta
        - Wachendorfia
      - - - Schiekia
          - Xiphidium
        - Pyrrorhiza

== Description ==
Haemodoraceae is characterized by distichous leathery leaves, which are alternate, succulent, rather large and often ensiform, with entire margins and parallel veins. The leaves are enclosed by a sheath with free margins and alternate, distichous (= in two vertical ranks).

The plants are hermaphroditic. Pollinators are primarily insects, but also birds or sometimes a small mammal. The wooly-haired flowers grow at the end of a leaflet stalk, in cymes (with lateral branches), panicles or racemes.

The family is represented in Southwest Australia by extreme diversity, including around six genera that only occur in that region. The endemic species include the kangaroo paws, Anigozanthos and Macropidia, and the most speciose genus of the family, Conostylis.

== Genera ==
15 genera are accepted.

- Subfamily Conostylidoideae
  - Anigozanthos Labill. – Kangaroo paws
  - Blancoa Lindl.
  - Conostylis R.Br.
  - Macropidia J.Drumm. ex Harv. – Black kangaroo paws
  - Phlebocarya R.Br.
  - Tribonanthes Endl.
- Subfamily Haemodoroideae
  - Barberetta Harv.
  - Cubanicula Hopper, J.E.Gut., E.J.Hickman, M.Pell. & Rhian J.Sm.
  - Dilatris P.J.Bergius
  - Haemodorum Sm. – Bloodroots
  - Lachnanthes Elliott
  - Pyrrorhiza Maguire & Wurdack
  - Schiekia Meisn.
  - Wachendorfia Burm. ex L.
  - Xiphidium Aubl.

The term "bloodwort" can also apply to Sanguinaria canadensis (more often called bloodroot) or Achillea millefolium (more often called yarrow or common yarrow), in other families.

== Bibliography ==
- Agardh, Carl Adolph (1825). "XI. Liliiflorae". Classes Plantarum (in Latin). Lund: Literis Berlingianis. p. 8.
- Brown, Robert (1810). Prodromus Florae Novae Hollandiae et Insulae Van Diemen (in Latin). London: Richard Taylor & Son.
- The families of flowering plants Archived 2007-01-03 at the Wayback Machine Descriptions, illustrations, identification, information retrieval.
- Monocot families (USDA)
- Haemodoraceae Archived 2008-12-01 at the Wayback Machine at CSDL
- overview of taxa in Western Australia Archived 2011-07-09 at the Wayback Machine (144 entries)
