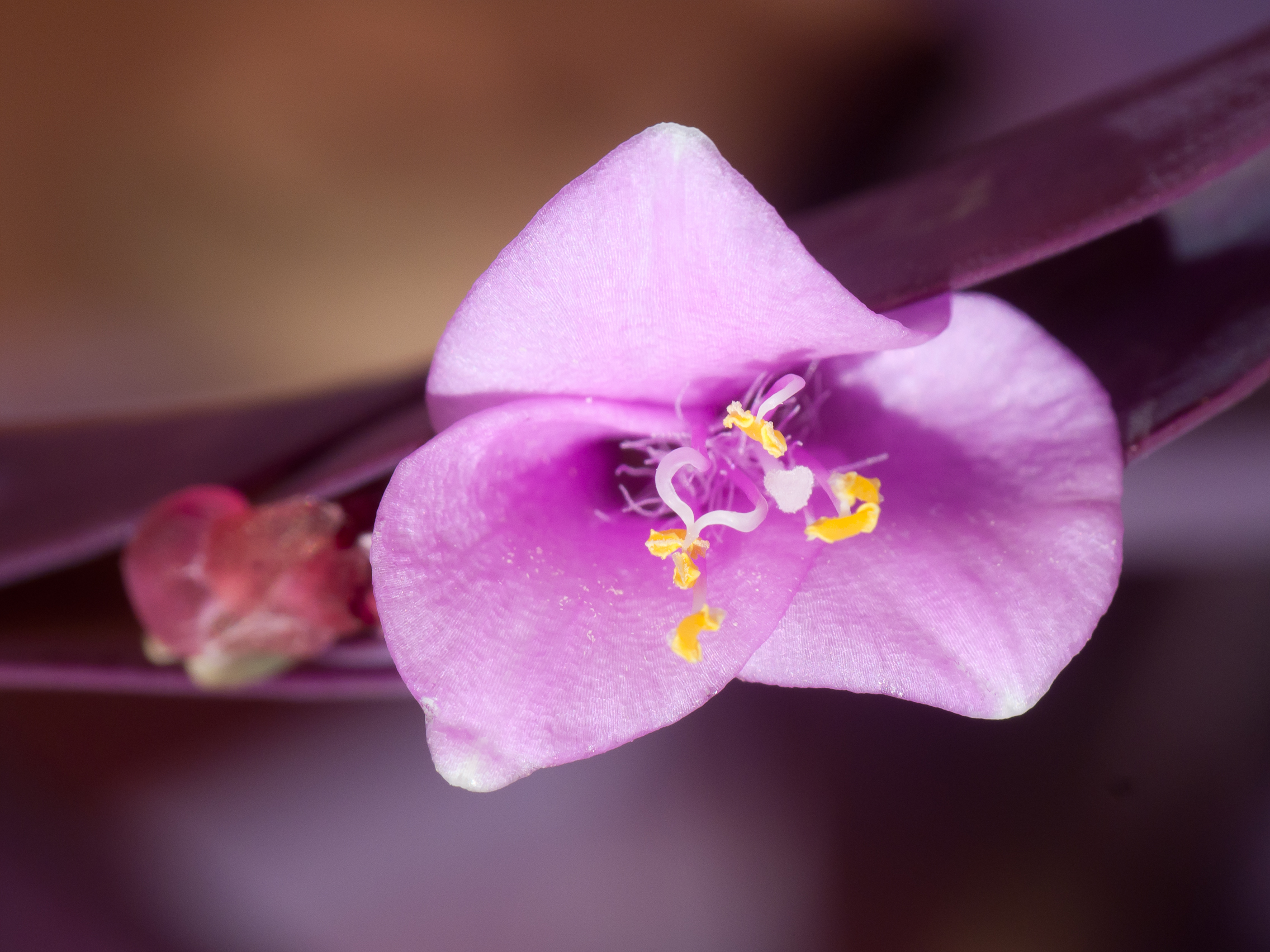
- Tradescantia pallida

Scientific classification
- Kingdom: Plantae
- Clade: Tracheophytes
- Clade: Angiosperms
- Clade: Monocots
- Clade: Commelinids
- Order: Commelinales; Mirb. ex Bercht. & J.Presl

Families
- Commelinaceae; Haemodoraceae; Hanguanaceae; Philydraceae; Pontederiaceae

Synonyms
- Haemodorales

= Commelinales =

Commelinales Temporal range: 80–0 Ma Late Cretaceous - Recent

Order of flowering plants

Commelinales is an order of flowering plants. It comprises five families: Commelinaceae, Haemodoraceae, Hanguanaceae, Philydraceae, and Pontederiaceae. All the families combined contain over 885 species in about 70 genera; the majority of species are in the Commelinaceae. Plants in the order share a number of synapomorphies that tie them together, such as a lack of mycorrhizal associations and tapetal raphides. Estimates differ as to when the Commelinales evolved, but most suggest an origin and diversification sometime during the mid- to late Cretaceous. Depending on the methods used, studies suggest a range of origin between 123 and 73 million years, with diversification occurring within the group 110 to 66 million years ago. The order's closest relatives are in the Zingiberales, which includes ginger, bananas, cardamom, and others.

== Taxonomy ==
According to the most recent classification scheme, the APG IV of 2016, the order includes five families:

- Commelinaceae
- Haemodoraceae
- Hanguanaceae
- Philydraceae
- Pontederiaceae

This is unchanged from the APG III of 2009 and the APG II of 2003, but different from the older APG system of 1998, which did not include Hanguanaceae.

=== Previous classification systems ===
The older Cronquist system of 1981, which was based purely on morphological data, placed the order in subclass Commelinidae of class Liliopsida and included the families Commelinaceae, Mayacaceae, Rapateaceae and Xyridaceae. These families are now known to be only distantly related. In the classification system of Dahlgren the Commelinales were one of four orders in the superorder Commeliniflorae (also called Commelinanae), and contained five families, of which only Commelinaceae has been retained by the Angiosperm Phylogeny Group.
