= Kangaroo paw =

Plant species endemic to Western Australia

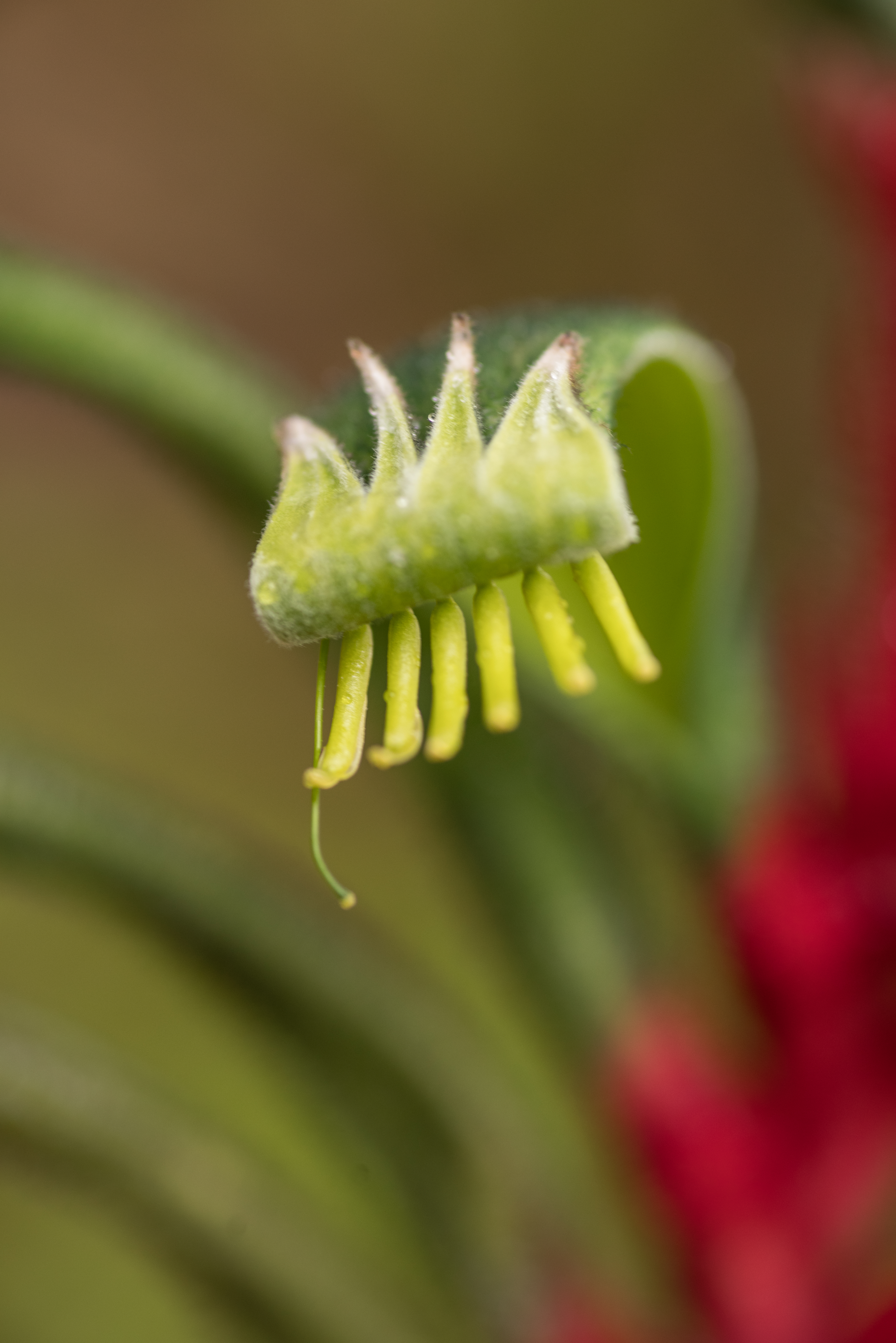
aspect of a Anigozanthos manglesii showing the characteristic of the plant from which its name is derived

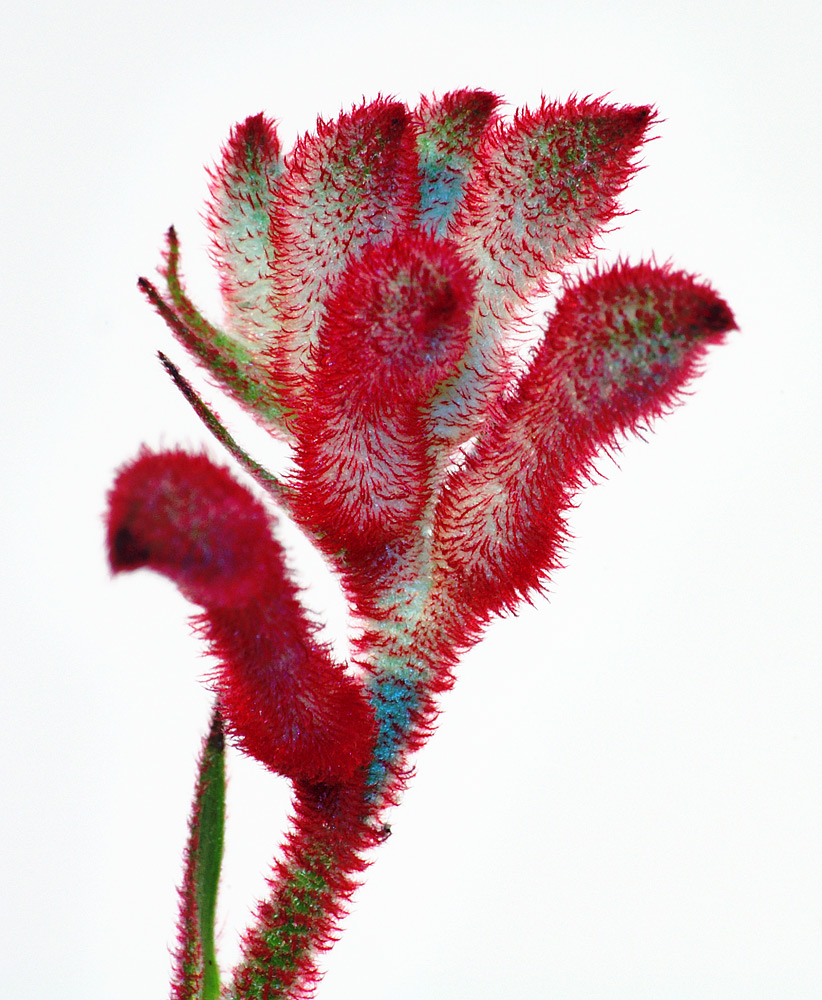
Anigozanthos flavidus

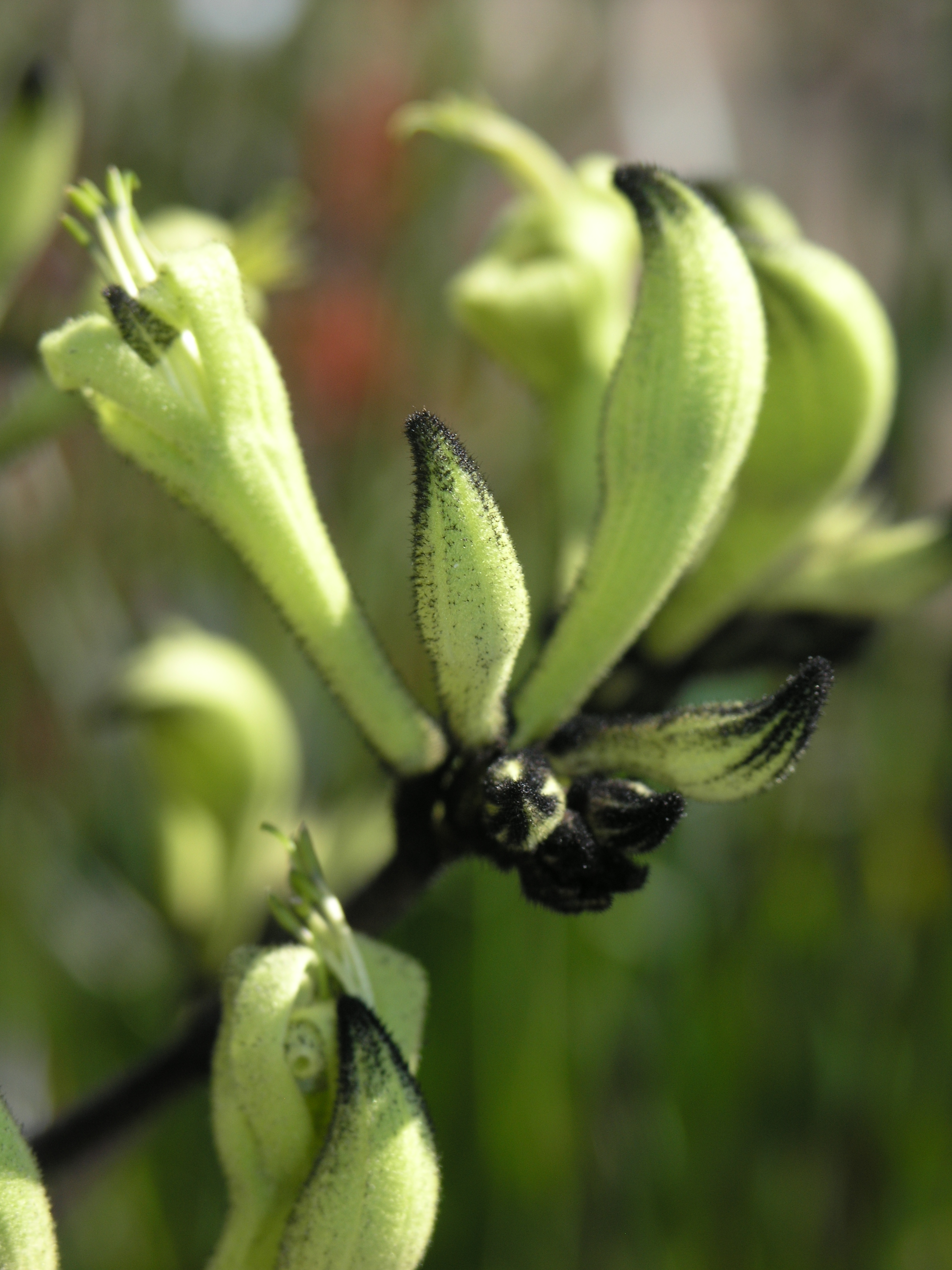
Macropidia fuliginosa

Kangaroo paw is the common name for a number of species, in two genera of the family Haemodoraceae, that are native to the south-west of Western Australia. These rhizomatous perennial plants are noted for their unique bird-attracting flowers. The tubular flowers are coated with dense hairs and open at the apex with six claw-like structures which resemble kangaroo forelimbs, and it is from this paw-like formation that the common name "kangaroo paw" is derived.

The kangaroo paw plant has been introduced into Japan and has been grown as a new ornamental crop mainly in Okinawa Island under a subtropical climate.

== History ==
The genus Anigozanthos' author was French botanist Jacques-Julien Houtou de Labillardière, who first collected the kangaroo paw in 1792 near Esperance. Red and green kangaroo paw or Kurulbrang (Noongar) was introduced to England in 1833, and was first described in 1836 by botanist David Don. The specific name manglesii is so named in honour of the first individual to raise the specimen from seed, Robert Mangles, which he did in his English garden. His experience with growing the specimen is recorded in letters to his brother James Mangles.

The red and green kangaroo paw was adopted as the state emblem of Western Australia in a proclamation on 9 October 1960. An image of a red and green kangaroo paw was superimposed onto a view of Perth from a distance on a 5 pence stamp, issued 1 November 1962, commemorating the Seventh British Empire and Commonwealth Games which were held in Perth that year. The stamp was designed by R. M. Warner. The red and green kangaroo paw was again included on a stamp on 10 July 1968, which were six-cent stamps in a series of state floral emblems. It was designed by Nell Wilson.

In 1990, disease was found on the kangaroo paw plant in Okinawa. The unreported fungi, which caused the plant to become very limp and wilt, was characterised by a discolouration of the plant leaving it a brown to black colour around the stalks, leaves and base of the plant. As the plant began to discolour over time, white cottony mycelia started to appear at the surface of the lesions and then the plant eventually died.

== Cultivation and cut flowers ==
The plant is native to south-western Australia, occurring naturally from the Murchison River in the North to Busselton and Mount Barker in the South, and Lake Muir to the East. It has been developed as a cut-flower crop in the United States, Israel and Japan. In Israel, plants are propagated from tissue culture imported from Australia and are then grown in unheated greenhouses in natural day conditions. The plants have found their way to California and become popular among garden supply businesses there.

=== Research ===
In 2007 Kings Park Botanic and Garden Board started a breeding program to protect the Kangaroo Paw from disease and the impact of climate changes. During this effort cross breading between 5 different species brought about new colouring including blue shades. The breeding program is working with Edith Cowan University to map the genome sequences, look to find disease and drought resistant triggers for the plant.

Research leading up to 2020 has been able to produce many new colours for the kangaroo paw including blues, purples, whites, and many more. This has led to genetic research and DNA sequencing similar to that carried out on Snapdragons to understanding the colours of the flower. Other research has been conducted that indicates an extract of the plant may help firm the skin as it targets young cells causing increased collagen output.

== Classification ==
From the genus Anigozanthos:

- Anigozanthos bicolor Endl. (little kangaroo paw)
  - Anigozanthos bicolor ssp. bicolor (two-coloured kangaroo paw)
  - Anigozanthos bicolor ssp. decrescens
  - Anigozanthos bicolor ssp. exstans
  - Anigozanthos bicolor ssp. minor
- Anigozanthos flavidus DC. (tall kangaroo paw)
- Anigozanthos gabrielae Domin (dwarf kangaroo paw)
- Anigozanthos manglesii D.Don (red-and-green kangaroo paw)
  - Anigozanthos manglesii ssp. manglesii
  - Anigozanthos manglesii ssp. quadrans
- Anigozanthos pulcherrimus Hook. (golden kangaroo paw)
- Anigozanthos rufus Labill. (red kangaroo paw)
- Anigozanthos viridis Endl. (green kangaroo paw)
  - Anigozanthos viridis subsp. terraspectans Hopper (dwarf green kangaroo paw)
  - Anigozanthos viridis subsp. metallica (metallic green kangaroo paw)

From the genus Macropidia:

- Macropidia fuliginosa (Hook.) Druce (black kangaroo paw)

== See also ==
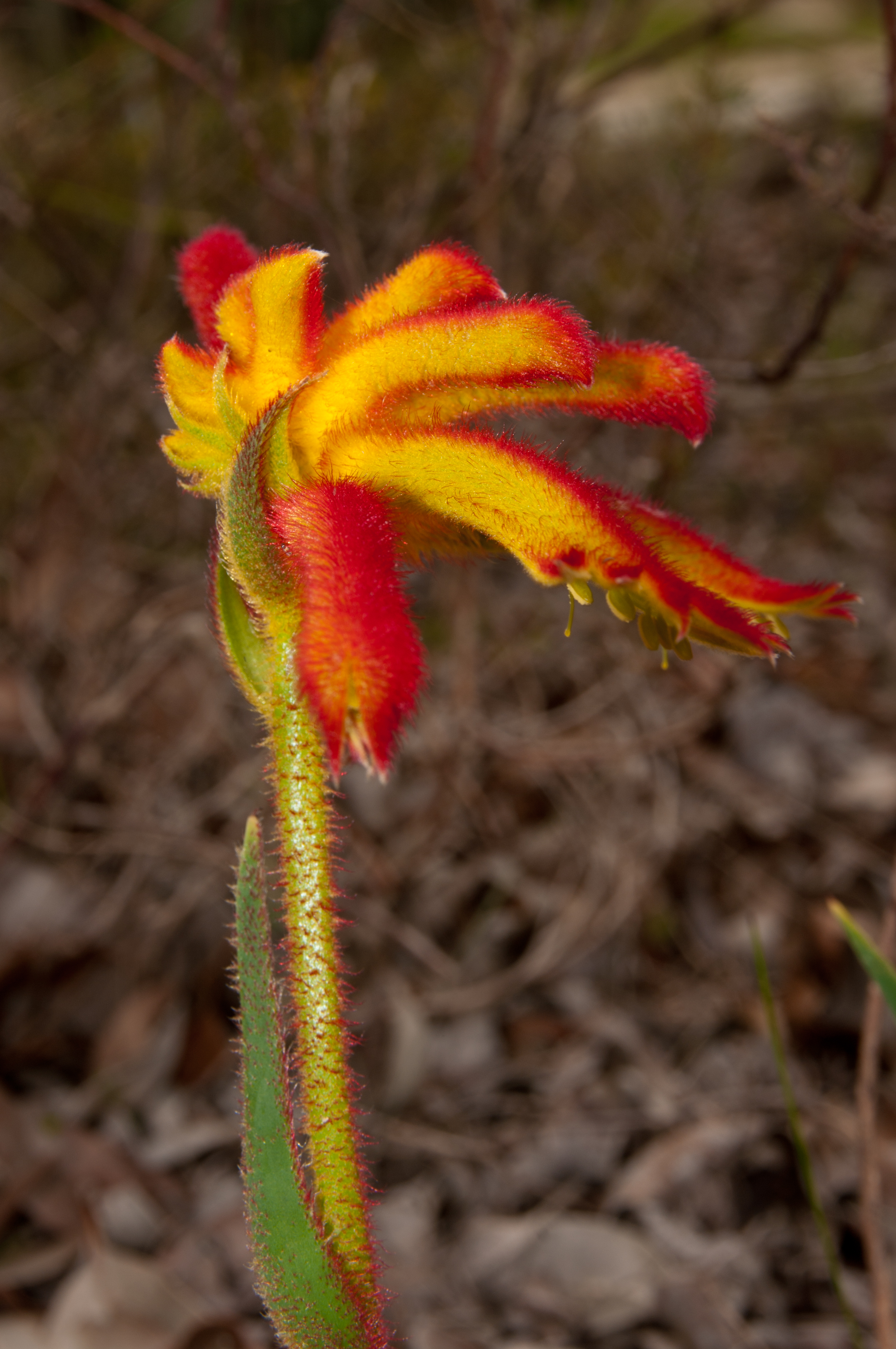
The smaller Anigozanthos humilis is known as cat's paw

Additional species in the genus Anigozanthos exist. They resemble kangaroo paws, however, they are instead known as cat's paws:

- Anigozanthos humilis (cat's paw)
  - Anigozanthos humilis ssp. chrysanthus (Mogumber cat's paw)
  - Anigozanthos humilis ssp. grandis (tall cat's paw)
- Anigozanthos kalbarriensis (Kalbarri cat's paw)
- Anigozanthos onycis (branched cat's paw)
- Anigozanthos preissii (Albany cat's paw)
