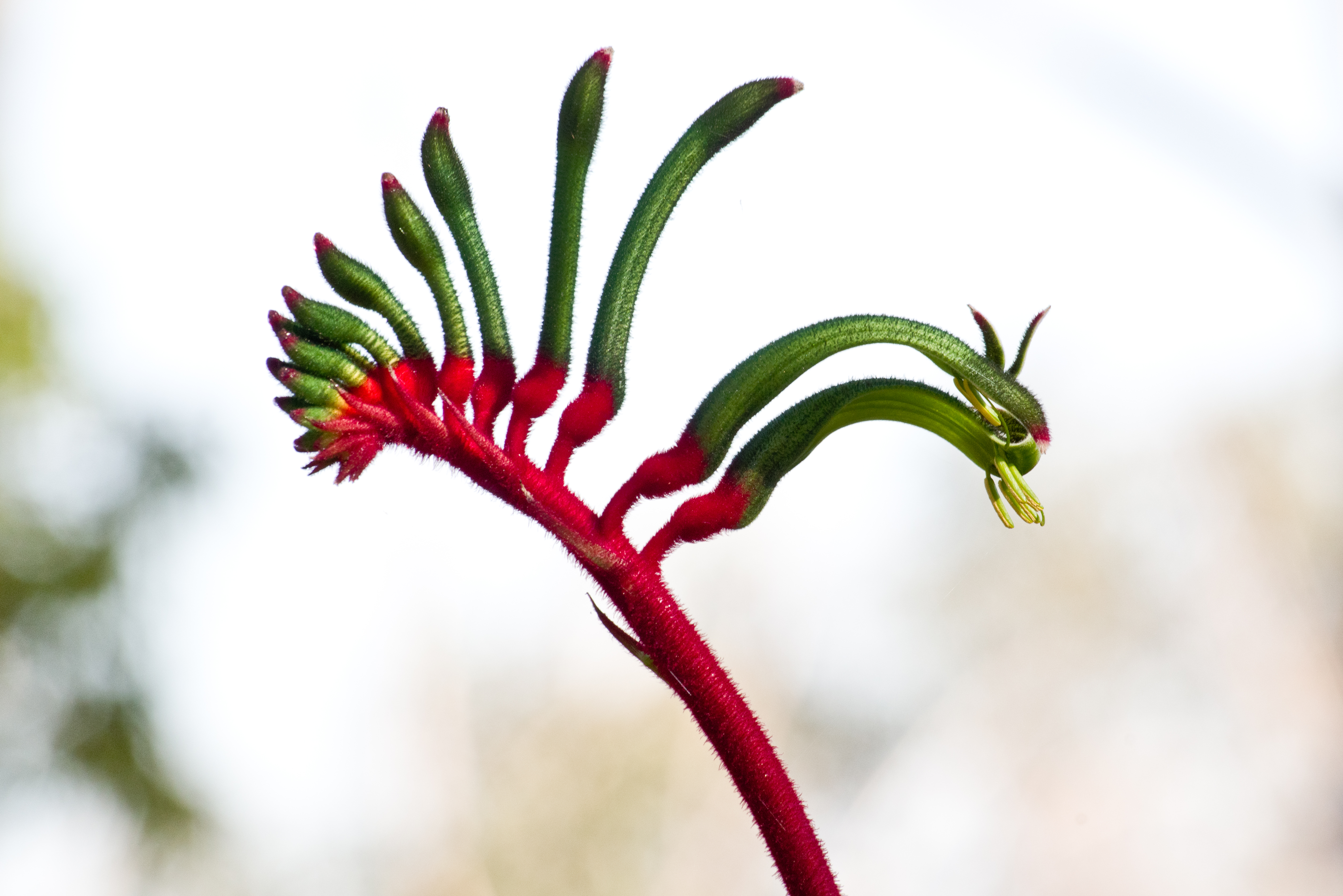

Scientific classification
- Kingdom: Plantae
- Clade: Embryophytes
- Clade: Tracheophytes
- Clade: Angiosperms
- Clade: Monocots
- Clade: Commelinids
- Order: Commelinales
- Family: Haemodoraceae
- Genus: Anigozanthos
- Species: A. manglesii

Binomial name
- Anigozanthos manglesii D.Don
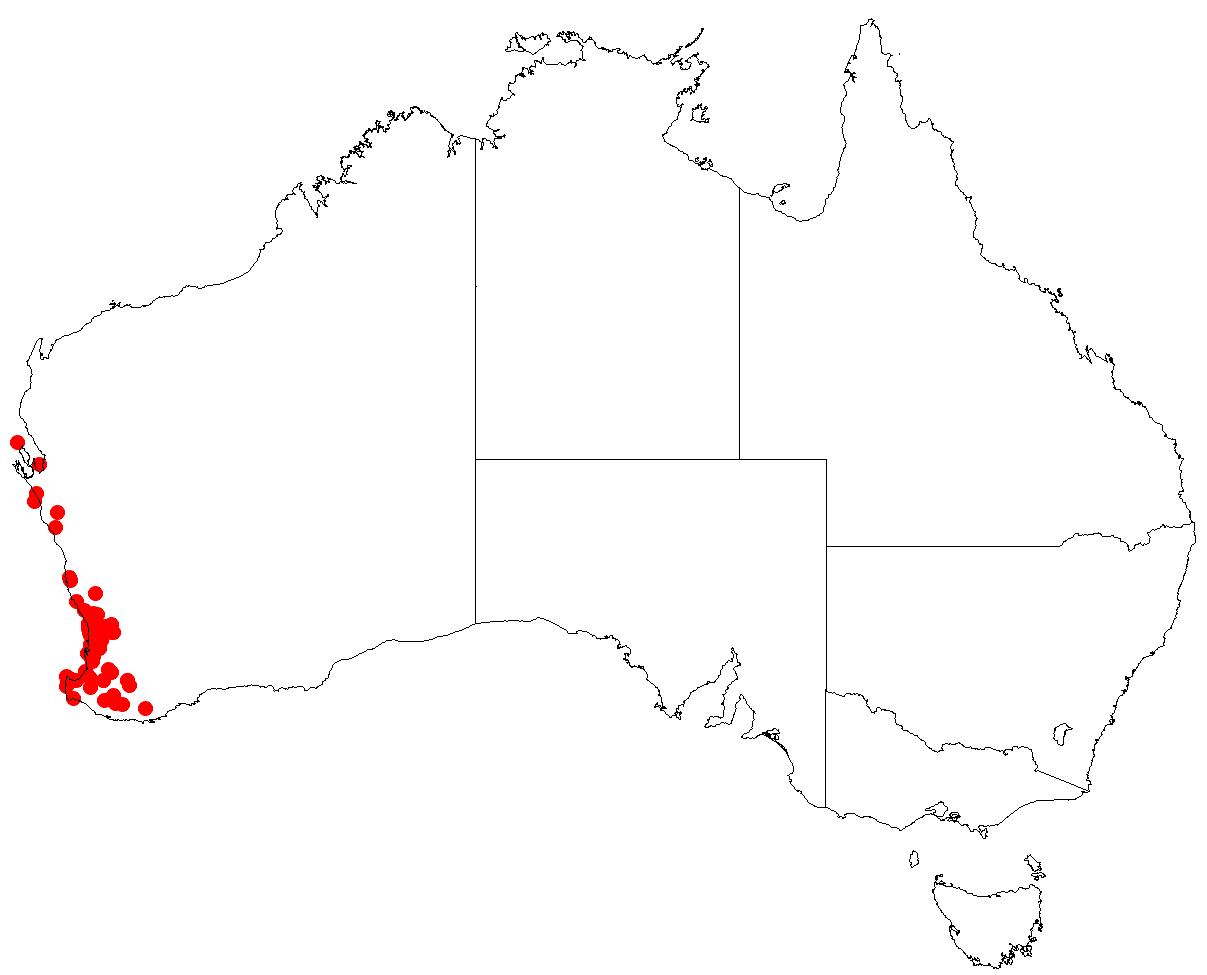
- Occurrence data from AVH

= Anigozanthos manglesii =

Species of flowering plant

Anigozanthos manglesii, commonly known as the red-and-green kangaroo paw, Mangles' kangaroo paw, or Nyungar: kurulbrang, is a plant species endemic to Western Australia, and the floral emblem of that state.

The flower has become symbolic of the region. The display between August and November is remarkable for the high standing flowers occurring in urban and coastal regions. The species is not threatened, but is protected under state legislation. A license is required for collection from the wild. It is desirable as a cut flower, possessing an unusual form and striking colours that last well.

== Description ==
A member of the Anigozanthos genus, Anigozanthos manglesii is a rhizotomous perennial with long, grey-green linear leaves around 30 to 60 centimetres (12 to 24 in) long. The leaves extended from a central point at ground level. Its flowers have a red pedicel and green tepals, and appear at the end of long stalks between August and November. The flowers display in a sequence from the lowest point, those following are in a progression of development. The spent flower-stalks may remain well after their season. The length of these stalks from the base is up to 1,200 millimetres (47 in).

== Distribution ==
The species is widely distributed throughout the Southwest Australian biogeographic regions, preferring white, yellow or grey sand, or sandy loam. The occurrence is confirmed in the northernmost part of its range in the Geraldton Sandplains and the Swan Coastal Plain near Perth. Extensive records also exist of occurrence in Jarrah Forest and Warren region to the south, but not reaching the southern coasts. It extends inland to the Avon Wheatbelt.

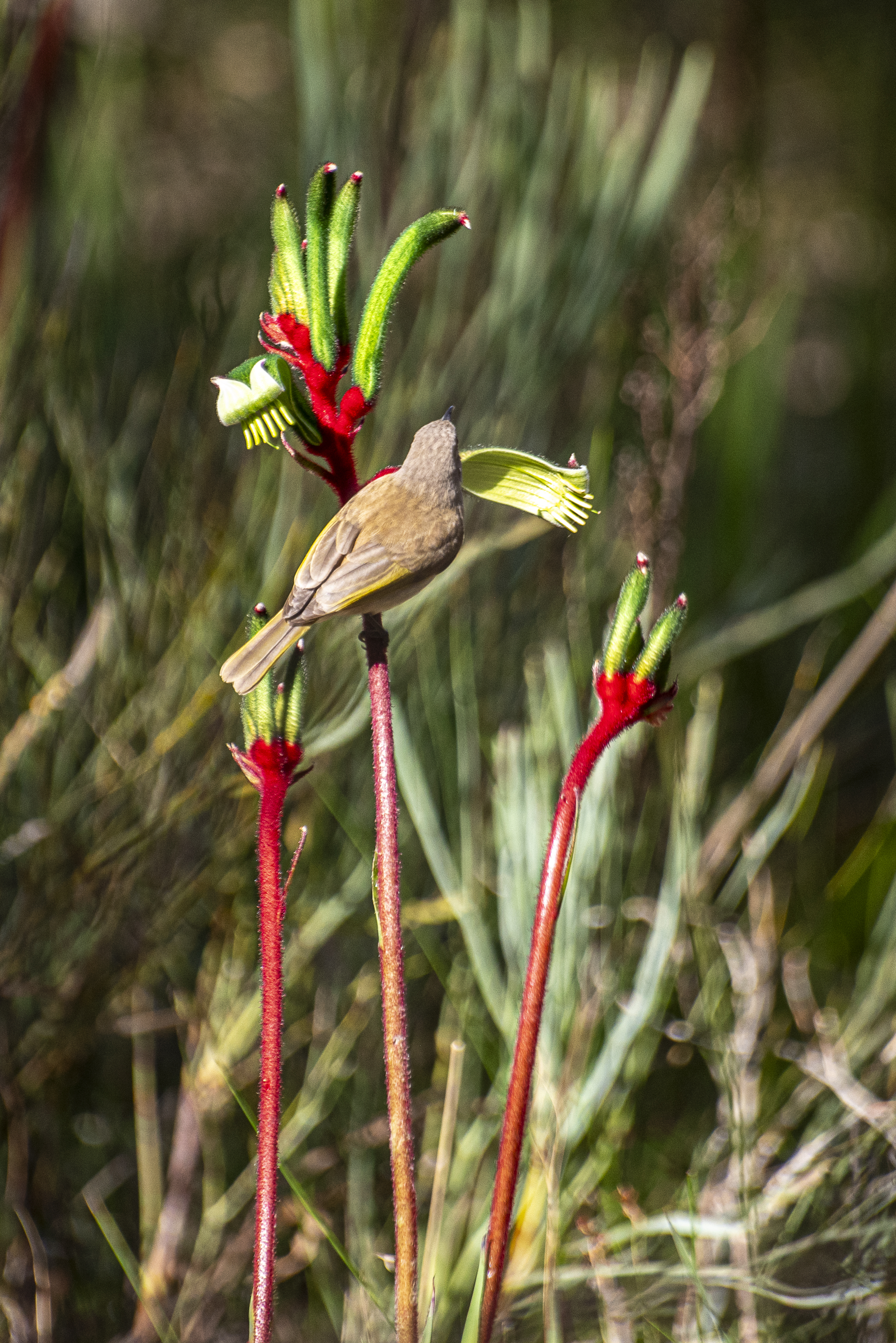
Bird feeding and pollinating

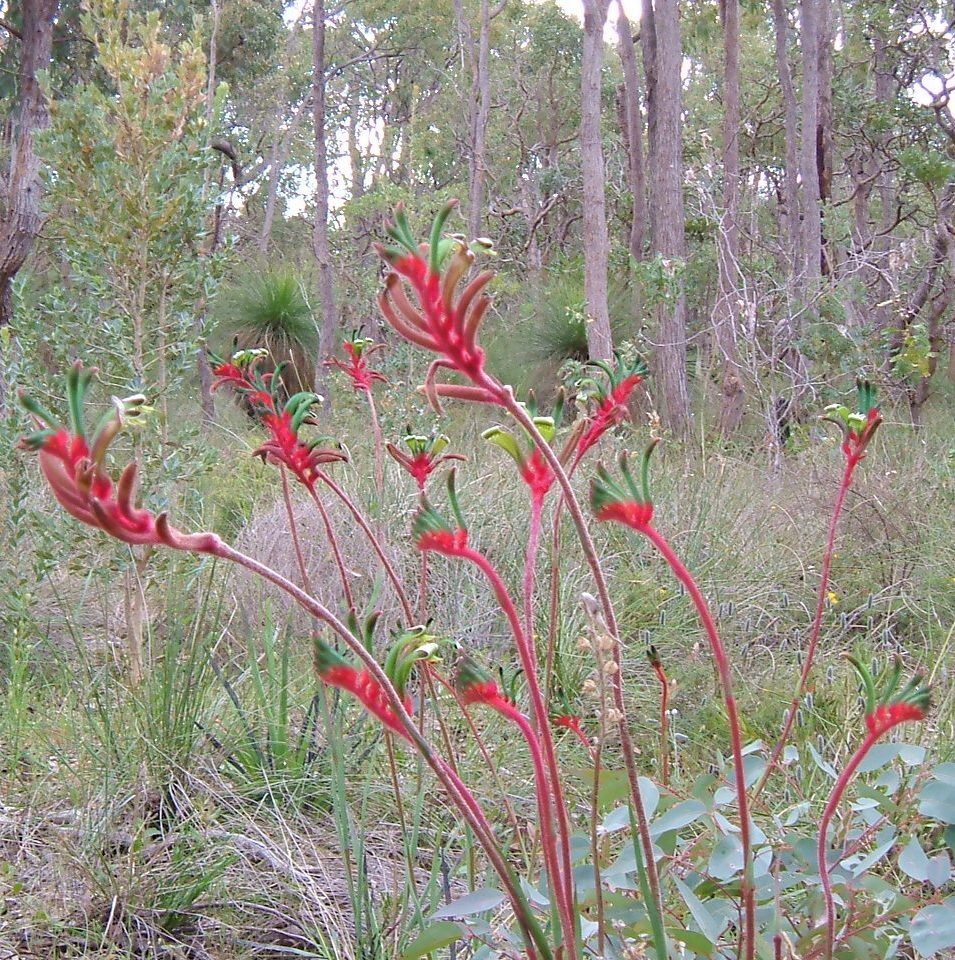
In bushland on Darling Scarp

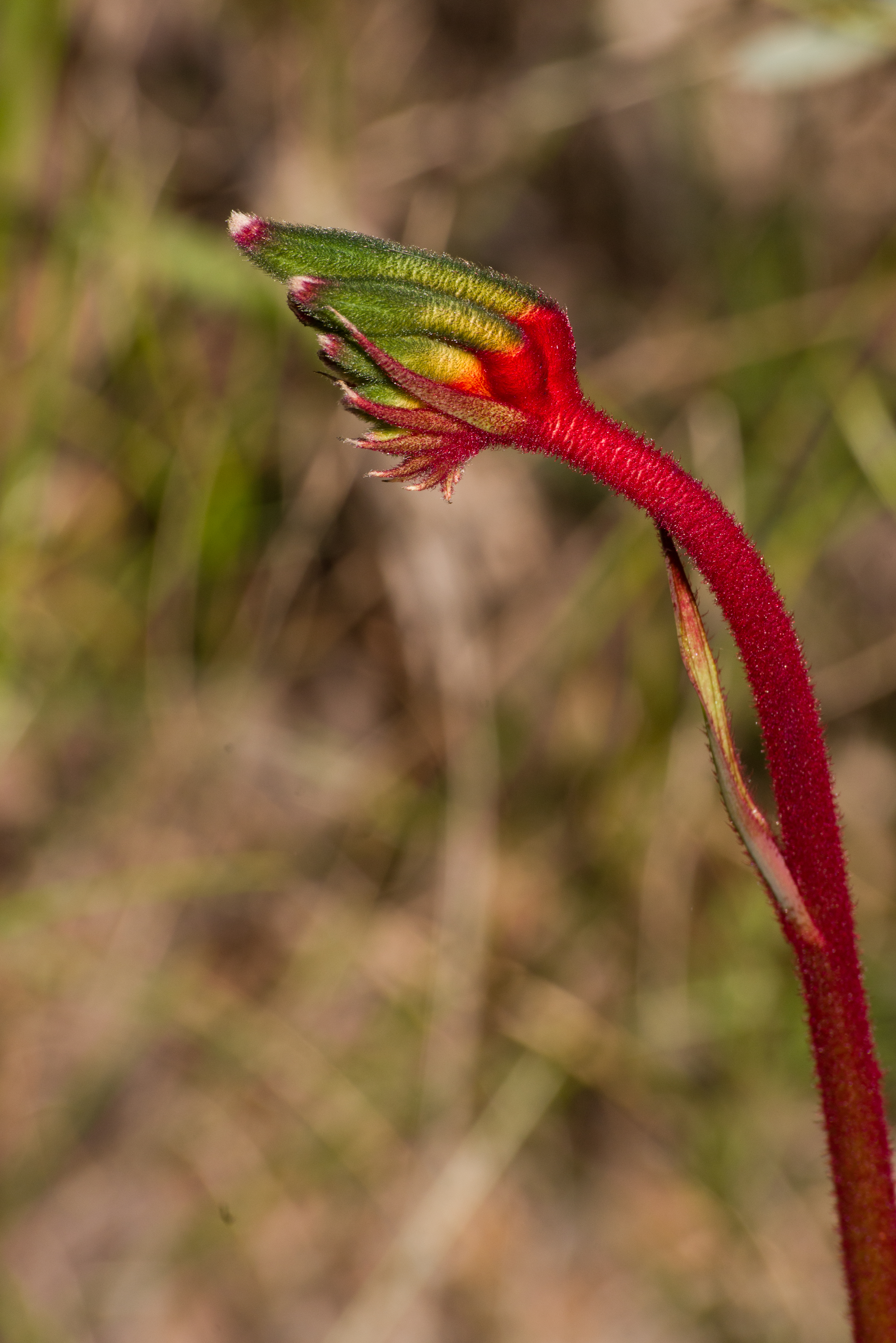
Late stages of bud

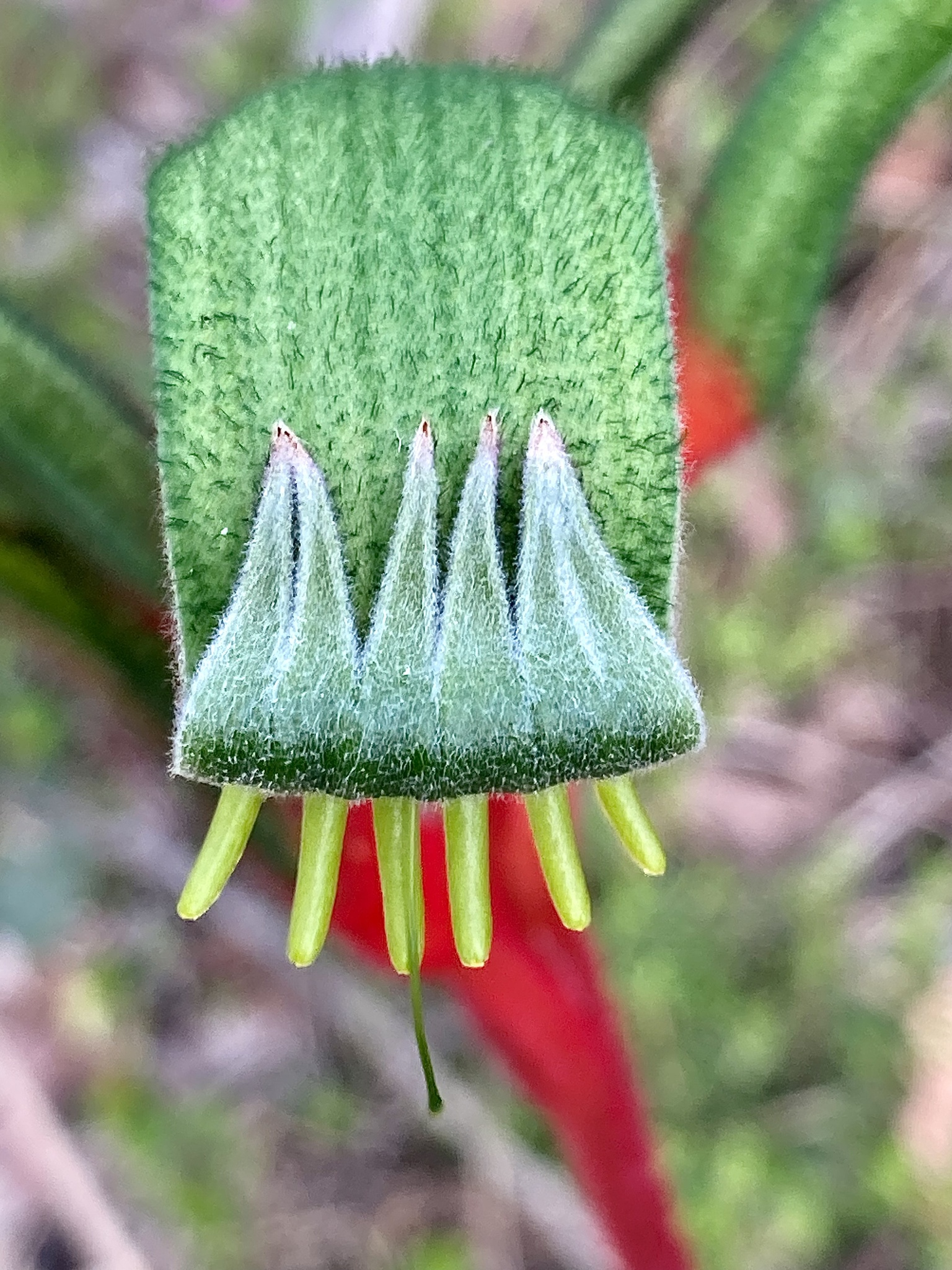
Part of plant from which common name (kangaroo paw) is derived

== Taxonomy ==
The species was first described by a Scottish botanist David Don in 1834 from the type specimen:

This singularly beautiful species of Anigozanthos was raised in the garden at Whitmore Lodge, Berks., the seat of Robert Mangles, Esq. from seeds brought from Swan River by Sir James Stirling, the enterprising governor of that colony, by whom they had been presented to Mr. Mangles.

There are two recognised subspecies as follows:

- Anigozanthos manglesii subsp. quadrans Hopper

Distribution of the subspecies is as far north as Shark Bay, variation in habit and structure of the subspecies is otherwise discrete.

- Anigozanthos manglesii D.Don subsp. manglesii

Wide occurrence as far north as Gingin and to Cape Leeuwin in the south.

Anigozanthos manglesii is known to hybridize naturally with other Anigozanthos species:

- A. viridis – progeny have been named Anigozanthos manglesii var. × angustifolius Lindl. and Anigozanthos manglesii var. × virescens Ostenf.
- A. bicolor
- A. kalbarriensis
- A. humilis

== Cultivars ==
Anigozanthos manglesii is often artificially hybridized with A. flavidus and to a lesser extent A. rufus. Cultivars include:

- Autumn Mystery - A. manglesii x A. flavidus
- Big Red - A. manglesii x A. flavidus
- Bush Emerald - A. manglesii x A. flavidus
- Hickman's Delight - A. manglesii x A. flavidus
- Rogue Radiance - (A. manglesii x A. rufus) x A. flavidus
- Space Age - A manglesii x A. flavidus
- Sue Dixon - (A. manglesii x A. rufus) x A. flavidus

== Cultivation ==
In temperate regions this plant is either grown under glass or outdoors with the winter protection of a mulch. The species germinates readily from seed. As plants generally deteriorate after the second season, they are best treated as biennial. Watering should be withheld during the dormant period. They are susceptible to fungal ink spot disease and the leaves are attractive to snails. They are often used as cut flowers, due to their unique appearance and lasting qualities.

This plant has gained the Royal Horticultural Society's Award of Garden Merit.

== Symbolic and artistic references ==
Coat of arms of Western Australia

In November 1960, Anigozanthos manglesii was adopted as the floral emblem of Western Australia in a proclamation made by the premier of Western Australia David Brand.

It also appears on the armorial bearings of that state, framing the crown in the coat of arms. This is given to denote the sovereignty and independence of Western Australia. The blazon reads:

And for Crest: On a Wreath Or and Sable The Royal Crown between two Kangaroo Paw (Anigosanthos [sic] Manglesii) flowers slipped proper.

A red and green kangaroo paw superimposed over a scene of Perth was depicted on a five pence on a 1962 Australian stamp issue designed by R. M. Warner to mark the British Empire and Commonwealth Games held in Perth that year. In 1968 another stamp issue, designed by Nell Wilson, showed the red and green kangaroo paw as part of a series on state floral emblems.

== See also ==
- List of Australian floral emblems

== Sources ==
- "Anigozanthos manglesii". FloraBase. Western Australian Government Department of Biodiversity, Conservation and Attractions.
- "Anigozanthos manglesii D. Don". Australian Plant Name Index (APNI), IBIS database. Canberra, Australian Capital Territory: Centre for Plant Biodiversity Research, Australian Government.
- "Anigozanthos manglesii". The Kangaroo Paw Family. ASGAP. 4 June 2004. Archived from the original on 1 September 2007. "The plant is susceptible to fungal disease such as "ink spot", which is first seen as small black spots on the foliage which gradually spread and kill the plant."
- Anne Boden (11 October 2006). "Red and Green Kangaroo Paw. Anigozanthos manglesii". Emblems. Australian National Botanic Gardens (ANBG). Archived from the original on 20 August 2007.
- "Proclamation". Australian National Botanic Gardens and Centre for Australian National Biodiversity Research. "[...] a floral emblem be adopted as an emblem of the State of Western Australia and further that such emblem ought to be the flower of the plant known as the Kangaroo Paw and more fully described as Anigosanthos Manglesii D. Don [...]."
