= Anigozanthos onycis =

Scientific classification
- Kingdom: Plantae
- Clade: Tracheophytes
- Clade: Angiosperms
- Clade: Monocots
- Clade: Commelinids
- Order: Commelinales
- Family: Haemodoraceae
- Genus: Anigozanthos
- Species: A. onycis

Binomial name
- Anigozanthos onycis A. S. George
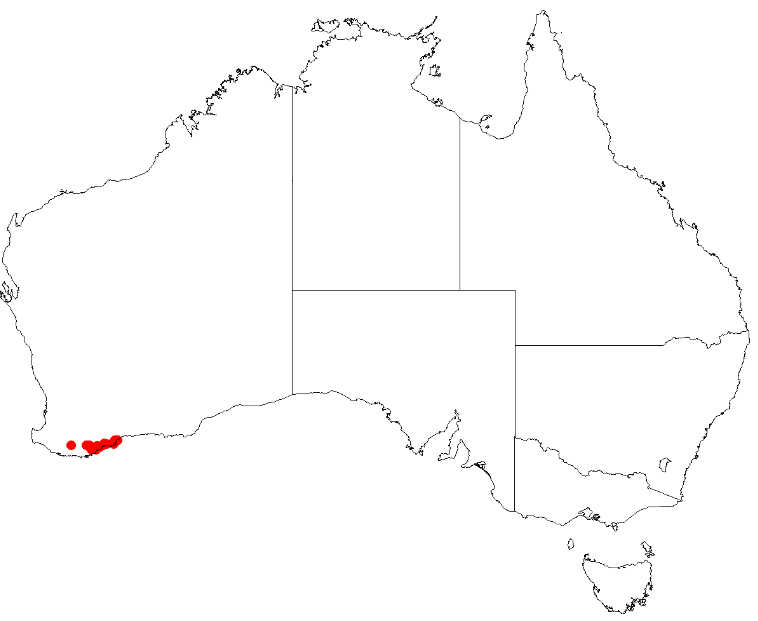

Species of flowering plant

Anigozanthos onycis, the branched catspaw, is a rarely seen plant found in Southwest Australia.

== Taxonomy ==
Anigozanthos onycis was first described by Alex George in 1974. George assigned the epithet onycis for the clawed appearance of the flower when opened, derived from the Greek onyx (a talon or claw). The unknown species was brought to the attention of the author in 1962, at a flower show in Kalgoorlie (500 km beyond its known range), but the source of this specimen was not determined. A collection made by Honor Venning was presented to the Western Australian Herbarium in 1969, and another made by Bob Dixon, obtained from a private property south of the Stirling Range in 1972, was used by George for its formal description.

The common name branched catspaw distinguishes the flowering scape of A. onycis from other species known as catspaws: A humilis, A. preissii and A. kalbarriensis, smaller species of Anigozanthus. Catspaw is presumed to have been applied as a diminutive of kangaroo paw, the collective name of the genus.

== Description ==
A species of Anigozanthus, the kangaroo paws and catspaws, which have single leaves emerging from a rhizome and tubular flowers presented on a scape. The leaves of this species are broadly keel-shaped on profile, their length is around 50 to 500 mm long. The color of the flowers is creamy to slightly reddish, these are presented in racemes on branched scapes that are 150 to 300 mm tall. The flowering season is September to October, earlier than most Anigozanthus species. They are periodically abundant in open woodlands cleared by fire, providing a conspicuous display of flowers against a blackened landscape.

Anigozanthos onycis emerges after summer fires, growing and setting seed in the first year and losing vigour in the second if the plant survives at all. This short lifespan only allows the size of the plant to reach around 200 mm in width, presenting fewer leaves than others of the genus. The reproductive strategy within its fire prone habitat is as a seeder, relying on a seedbank that is triggered by fire rather than resprouting from their rhizome. The sole pollinator is the tawny-crowned honeyeater (Gliciphila melanops), a nectar feeder that has specialised in the same habitat.

The branched catspaw is allied to Anigozanthos humilis and A. preissii. The common catspaw, Anigozanthos humilis subsp. humilis, has a similar appearance and naturally hybridises with this species. A widely grown cultivar named Anigozanthos 'Dwarf Delight' was developed by hybridising A. onycis with the kangaroo paw A. flavidus.

== Distribution ==
The known distribution range is restricted to a semi-arid area near the south coast of Western Australia, within the Southwest Australia bioregion known as the Esperance Plains. Anigozanthos onycis was described from specimens obtained in sandy heathland between the Stirling Range and Green Range outcrops. It as relatively rare, occurring over a widespread range between the Murchison River and Albany, and extending to Bremer Bay in the east. The species was later found in the Fitzgerald River National Park, emerging after a large bushfire in 1989 and disappearing again in 1991.

The preferred habitat is sandy woodlands or adjacent to swamps, on white or grey sand, at the well drained soils of slopes and the top of hills.
