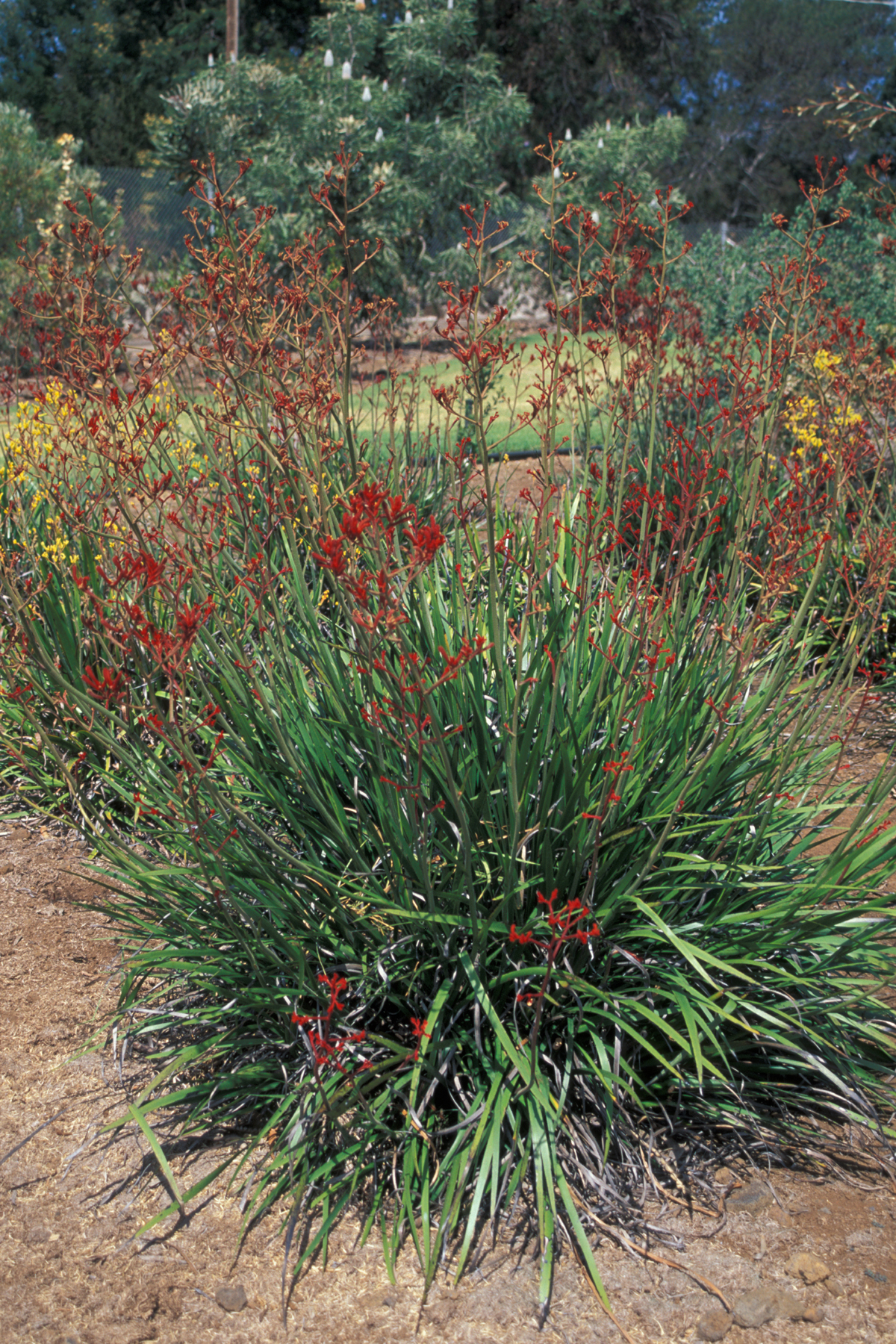
- Tall kangaroo paw (Anigozanthos flavidus)

Scientific classification
- Kingdom: Plantae
- Clade: Embryophytes
- Clade: Tracheophytes
- Clade: Angiosperms
- Clade: Monocots
- Clade: Commelinids
- Order: Commelinales
- Family: Haemodoraceae
- Subfamily: Conostylidoideae
- Genus: Anigozanthos; Labill.

Type species
- Anigozanthos rufus Labill.

Species
- Family has about 11 species, and several subspecies are known.

= Anigozanthos =

Genus of flowering plants

Anigozanthos is a genus of plant found naturally in the Southwestern Australia biogeographic region, belonging to the bloodwort family Haemodoraceae. The 11 species and their subspecies are commonly known as kangaroo paw or wallaby paw (formerly catspaw), depending on their size, and the shape and colour of their flowers. A further species, previously identified as Anigozanthos fuliginosus (black kangaroo paw), was separated to a monotypic genus as Macropidia fuliginosa. All 11 species of Anigozanthos are endemic to the south west of Western Australia, Noongar Boodjar.

The species are recognised for their unusual flowers, and numerous hybrids and cultivars have been developed for cultivation and floristry in recent years. Kangaroo paws are much in demand as house plants and as cut flowers. The red-and-green kangaroo paw is the floral emblem of Western Australia.

== Taxonomy ==
The genus was first named by Jacques Labillardière, a French botanist, in his work, Relation du Voyage à la Recherche de la Pérouse, issued in 1800; he collected and described the type species, Anigozanthos rufus, during the d'Entrecasteaux expedition's visit to Southwest Australia in 1792. However, he does not provide a meaning for this name in his description. C.A. Gardener derived it from the Greek words ἄνισος ánisos "unequal" and ἄνθος ánthos "flower" according to La Billardiere's description of its collective petals as 'irregular' and 'in the form of a tube divided at its extremities into six unequal parts', he assumed the "g" was inserted for euphony.

The common name 'kangaroo paw' was initially given to Anigozanthos manglesii and came to be used for other species of Anigozanthos as they became known. The origin of the name 'catspaw' is uncertain, but presumed to distinguish the compact size of the plant and flowers from others of the genus. Kangaroo paws refers to a grouping of species resembling A. manglesii, with elongated red and green (or green) flowers and greater overall size.

== Description ==
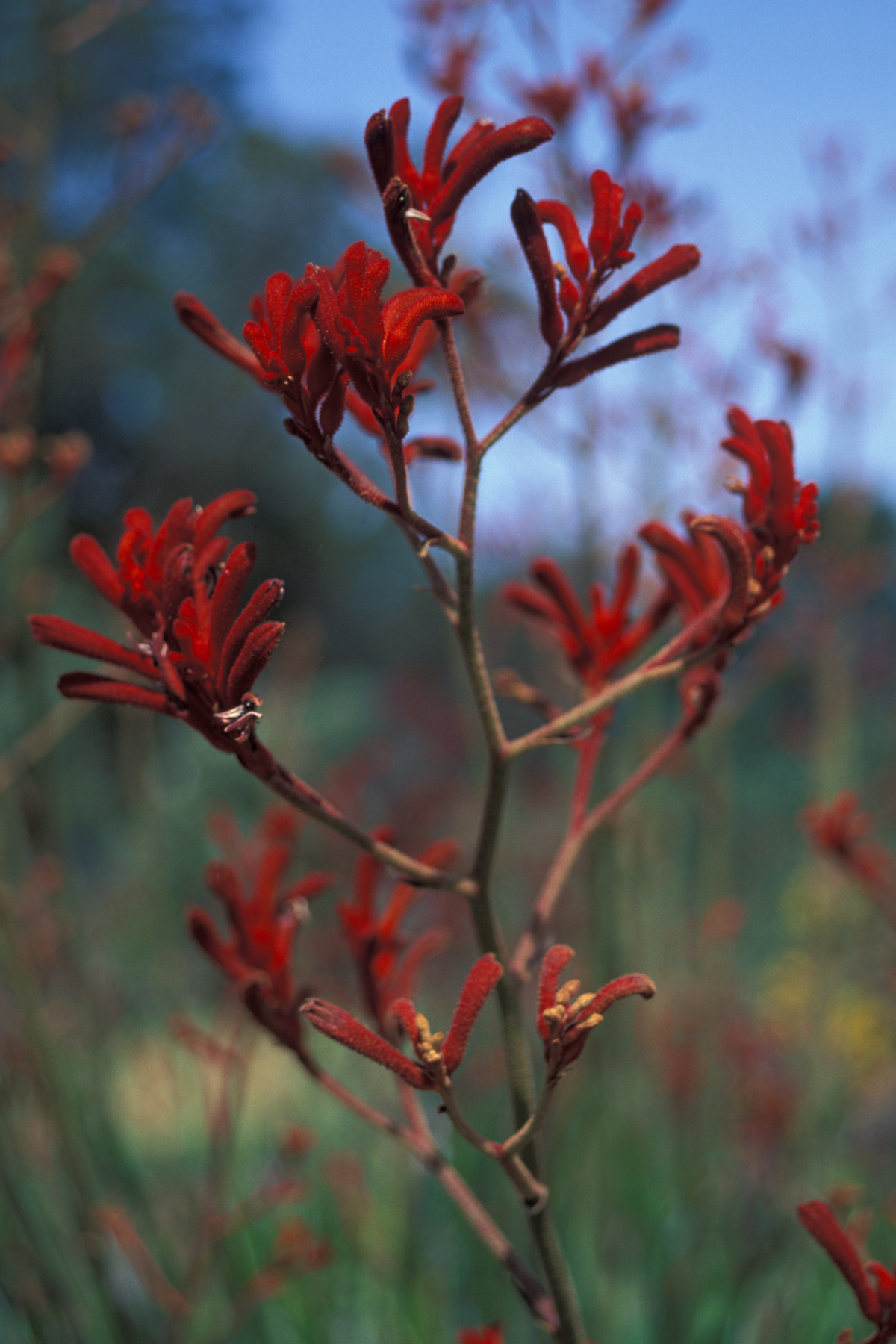
Tall kangaroo paw (Anigozanthos flavidus).

These perennials are endemic to dry sandy, siliceous areas of southwest Australia, but they occur as well in a variety of other environments and soil types. They are grown commercially in Australia, the United States, Japan and Israel.

The plant grows from short, underground, horizontal rhizomes. The length and the character of these may vary between the species: some are fleshy, others are fragile. The sap in the root system allows the plants to survive extreme dry spells. In summer, a number of species die back to the rhizome, growing back in autumn.

The plants have a basal rosette of long green to greyish-green leaves. The leaves of some species are hairy. From the heart of this rosette merge long leafless stalks, which can reach 2 m, ending in a raceme of flowers. The size and height of these stalks, which can be clothed in coloured hairs, varies between the species.

The tuberous flower buds are also covered with coloured hairs, giving it a velvety aspect. These long furry hairs also determine the colour of the flower, which may range from almost black to yellow, orange and red. Some species are even dichromatic (as Anigozanthos manglesii). The tubular form of the flower bud resembles a kangaroo paw, hence its name. The flower tip spreads fanlike into six petals. Full-grown plants can have up to ten flowers at the end of each stalk.

== Species ==
The genus comprises 11 species, some species with subspecies recognised by FloraBase as rare or endangered taxa.

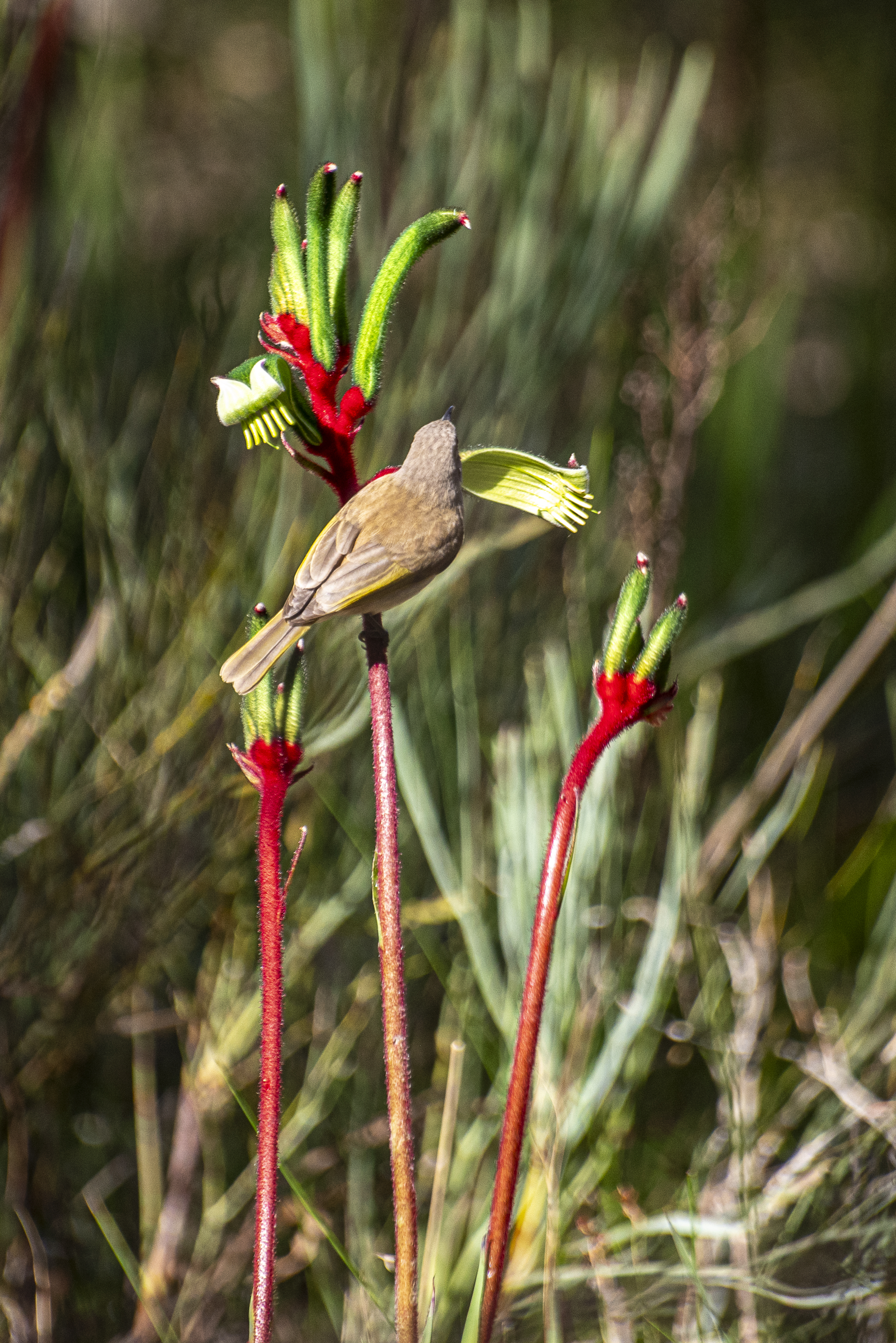
Birds are major a pollinator of the genus

- Anigozanthos bicolor Endl. (little kangaroo paw)
  - Anigozanthos bicolor subsp. bicolor (two-coloured kangaroo paw)
  - Anigozanthos bicolor subsp. decrescens
  - Anigozanthos bicolor subsp. exstans
  - Anigozanthos bicolor subsp. minor
- Anigozanthos flavidus DC. (tall kangaroo paw)
- Anigozanthos gabrielae Domin (dwarf kangaroo paw)
- Anigozanthos humilis
  - Anigozanthos humilis subsp. humilis (common catspaw)
  - Anigozanthos humilis subsp. chrysanthus (Mogumber catspaw)
  - Anigozanthos humilis subsp. grandis (tall catspaw)
- Anigozanthos kalbarriensis (Kalbarri catspaw)
- Anigozanthos manglesii D.Don (red-and-green kangaroo paw)
  - Anigozanthos manglesii subsp. manglesii
  - Anigozanthos manglesii subsp. quadrans
- Anigozanthos onycis (branched catspaw)
- Anigozanthos preissii (Albany catspaw)
- Anigozanthos pulcherrimus Hook. (golden kangaroo paw)
- Anigozanthos rufus Labill. (red kangaroo paw)
- Anigozanthos viridis Endl.
  - Anigozanthos viridis subsp. viridis (green kangaroo paw)
  - Anigozanthos viridis subsp. terraspectans Hopper (dwarf green kangaroo paw)
  - Anigozanthos viridis subsp. metallica (metallic green kangaroo paw)

== Commercial hybrids ==
The popularity of Anigozanthos, as a garden plant or commercially produced cut-flower, has led to the development of cultivars. The Australian Cultivar Registration Authority lists twenty seven registered names and descriptions of cultivars derived from the genus. A larger number of patents for these, accepted or granted 'varieties', are recorded in the Plant breeders' rights database.

- Anigozanthos 'Amber Velvet'
- Anigozanthos 'Autumn Mystery'
- Anigozanthos 'Autumn Sunrise'
- Anigozanthos 'Baby Roo'
- Anigozanthos 'Big Red'
- Anigozanthos 'Bush Ember'
- Anigozanthos 'Bush Emerald'
- Anigozanthos 'Bush Glow'
- Anigozanthos 'Bush Inferno'
- Anigozanthos 'Bush Ochre'
- Anigozanthos 'Bush Pearl'
- Anigozanthos 'Bush Ranger'
- Anigozanthos 'Bush Spark'
- Anigozanthos 'Bush Volcano'
- Anigozanthos 'Charm'
- Anigozanthos 'Copper Charm'
- Anigozanthos 'Dwarf Delight'
- Anigozanthos 'Early Spring'
- Anigozanthos 'Gold Velvet'
- Anigozanthos 'Green Dragon'
- Anigozanthos 'Harmony'
- Anigozanthos 'Hickman’s Delight'
- Anigozanthos 'Kings Park Federation Flame'
- Anigozanthos 'Lilac Queen'
- Anigozanthos 'Little Jewel'
- Anigozanthos 'Mini Red'
- Anigozanthos 'Miniprolific'
- Anigozanthos 'Patricia'
- Anigozanthos 'Pink Joey'
- Anigozanthos Bush Ballad aka 'Ramboball'
- Anigozanthos Bush Blitz aka 'Ramboblitz'
- Anigozanthos Bush Bonanza aka 'Rambubona'
- Anigozanthos Bush Elegance aka 'Rambueleg'
- Anigozanthos Bush Dance aka‘Rambudan'
- Anigozanthos Bush Diamond aka 'Rambodiam'
- Anigozanthos Bush Fury aka 'Rambofury'
- Anigozanthos Bush Rampage aka 'Ramboramp' or 'Rampaging Roy Slaven'
- Anigozanthos 'Regal Claw'
- Anigozanthos 'Regal Velvet'
- Anigozanthos 'Red Cross'
- Anigozanthos 'Rogue Radiance'
- Anigozanthos 'Ruby Jools'
- Anigozanthos 'Space Age'
- Anigozanthos 'Spence‘s Spectacular'
- Anigozanthos 'Sue Dixon'
- Anigozanthos 'Unity'
- Anigozanthos 'Velvet Harmony'
- Anigozanthos 'Werite Woorata'

== Gallery ==
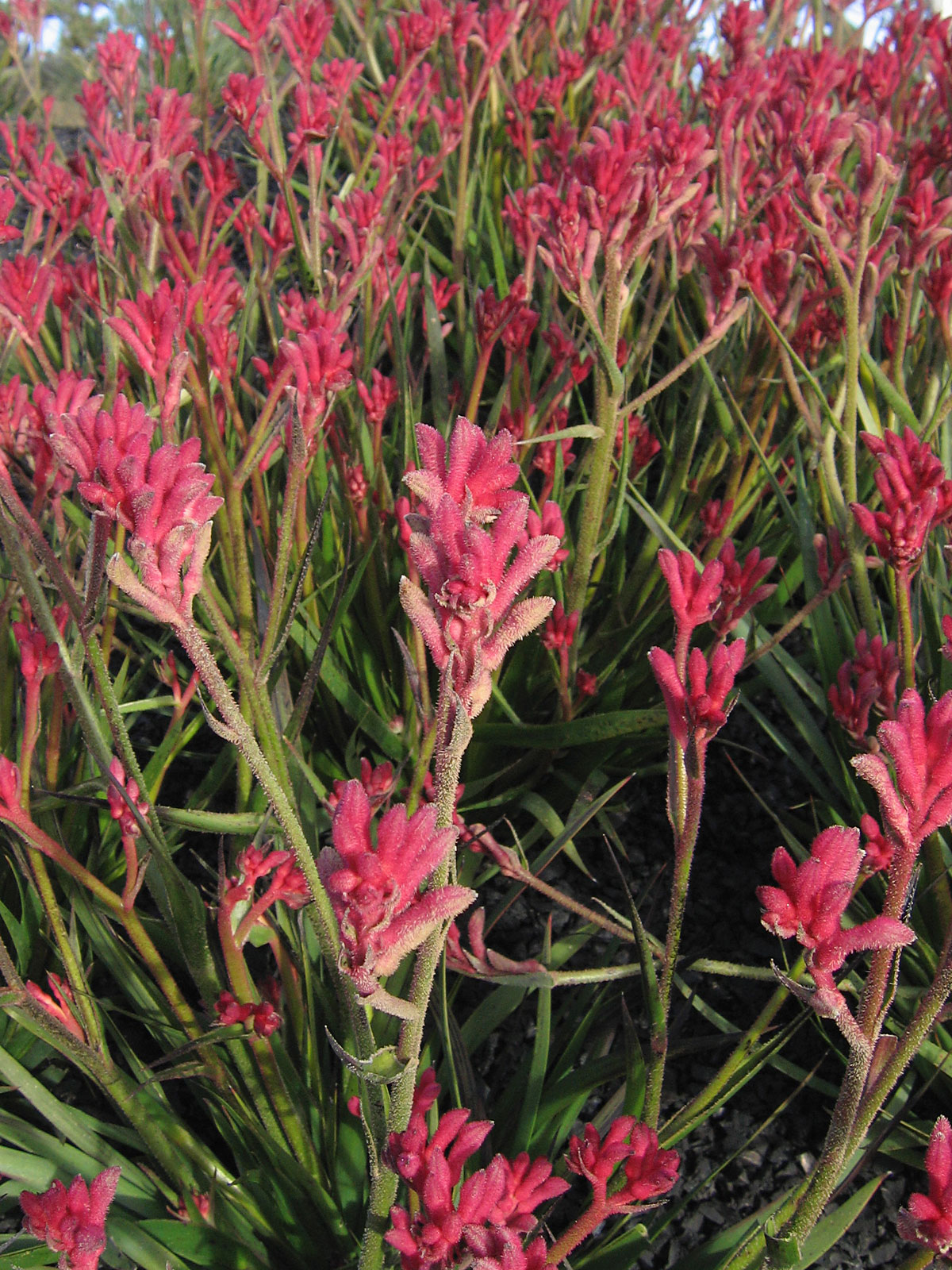
Anigozanthos Bush Pearl in the Royal Botanic Gardens, Cranbourne

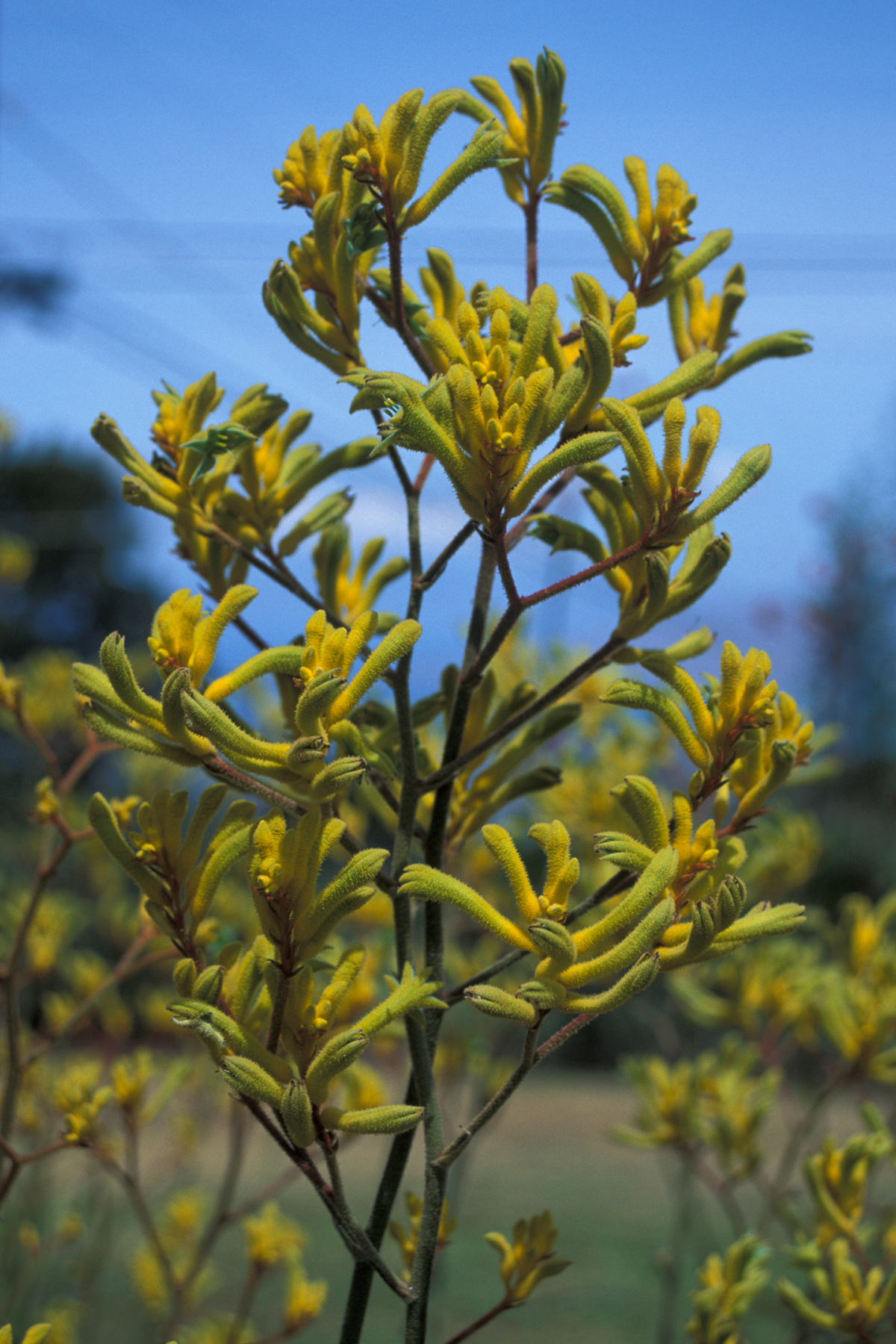
Tall kangaroo paw – yellow flowers.

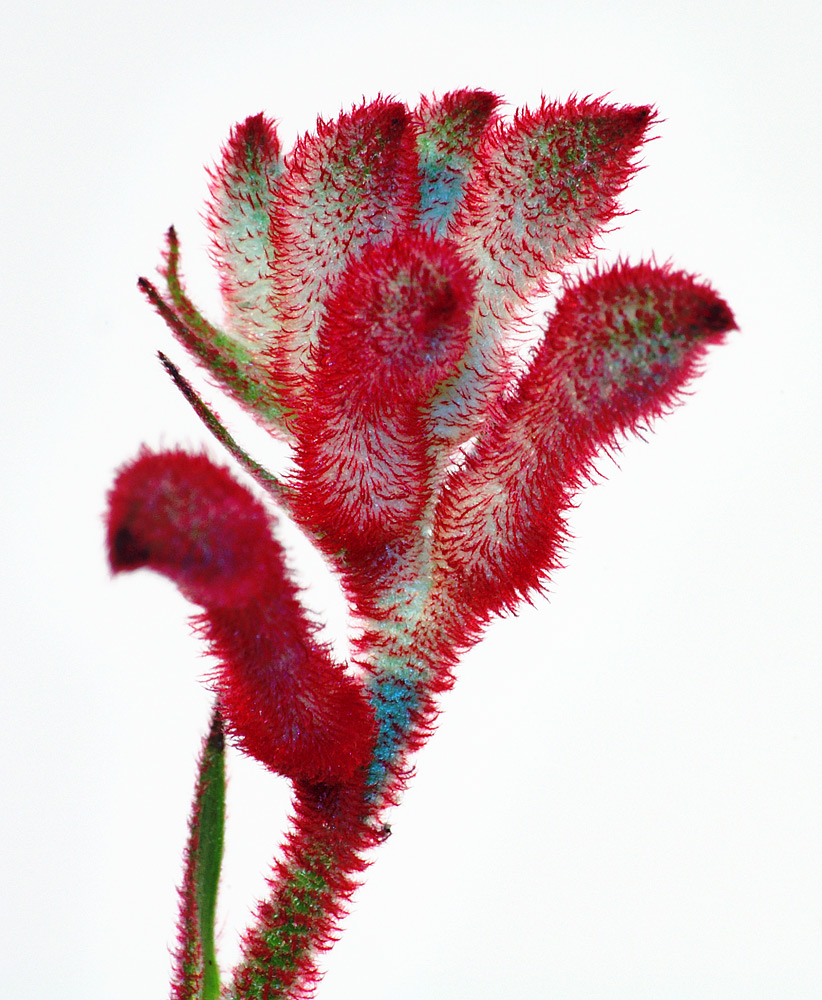
Kangaroo paw close-up.

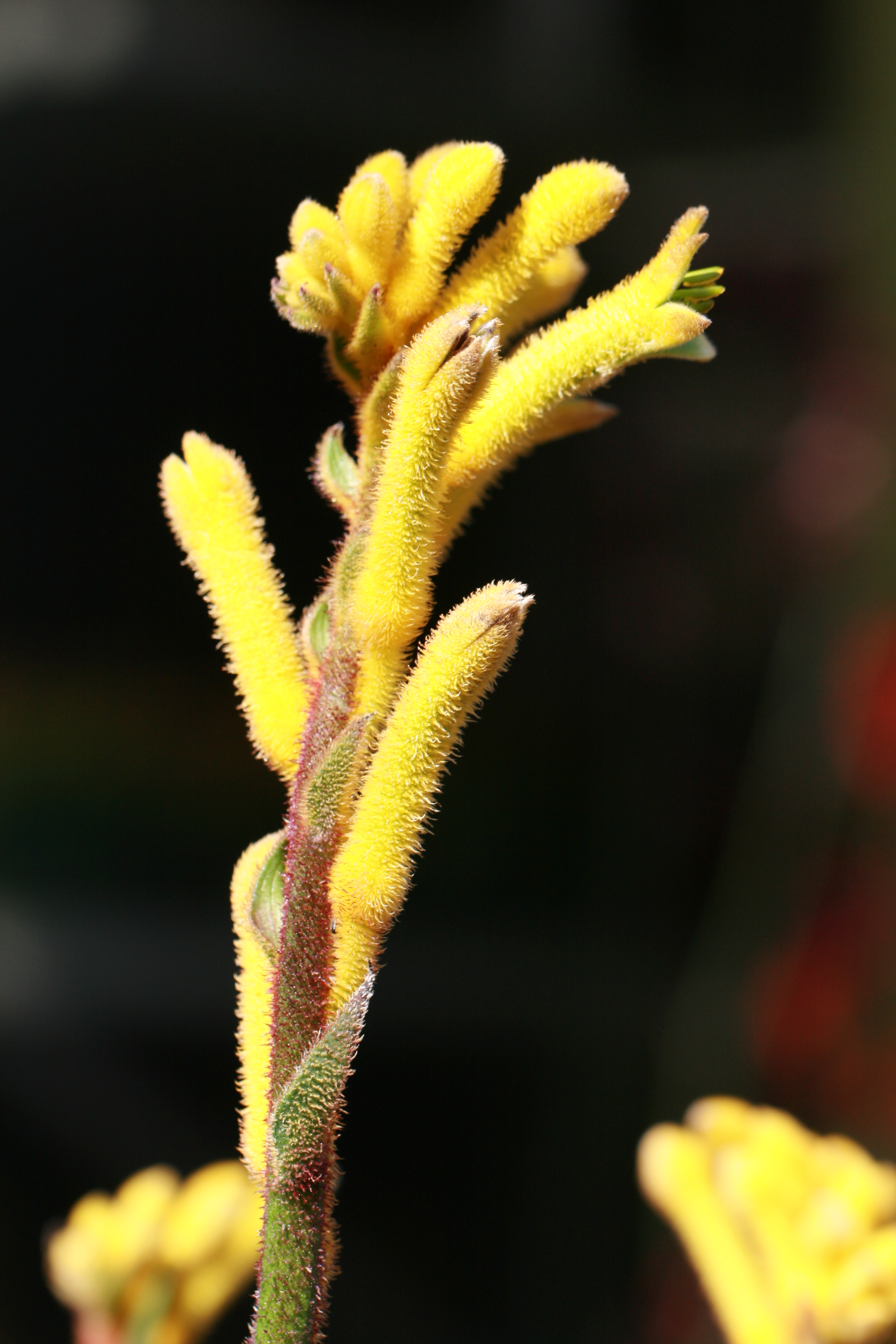
Anigozanthos 'Rambubona'.
