= Mangles family =

Mangles is the name of a wealthy English family whose members had amongst other things, interests in the Swan River Colony.

== Prominent members ==
Prominent members and interests include:

- James Mangles MP (1762–1838), High Sheriff for Surrey from 1808 to 1809, MP for Guildford in Parliament from 1831 to 1837.
- James Mangles FRS (1786–1867), nephew of James Mangles MP. Travelled extensively in the Middle East; co-authored Travels in Egypt and Nubia, Syria, and Asia Minor. Visited the Swan River Colony in 1831. Commissioned James Drummond (through George Fletcher Moore) to collect seeds, plants, and herbarium specimens. He also received seeds and plants from Georgiana Molloy.
- Robert Mangles (1780–1861), brother of James Mangles.
- Ellen Mangles (1807–1874), daughter of James Mangles MP. In 1823 she married James Stirling, later Admiral and Governor of Western Australia.
- Ross Donnelly Mangles (1801–77), son of James Mangles MP, Liberal Member for Guildford, 1841–1858, and chairman of the East India Company, 1857–1858.
- Ross Lowis Mangles (1833–1905), son of Ross Donnelly Mangles. One of only five civilians to have been awarded a Victoria Cross, for saving a wounded soldier during the Indian Mutiny.

== Others ==
- The shipping company F. & C.F. Mangles sent one convict ship (if not more) to Sydney around 1800. It ran a regular service to the colony from 1835. Its principal was James Mangles MP.
- The Western Australian state floral emblem, the Mangles kangaroo paw or red and green kangaroo paw, Anigozanthos manglesii, is named after James Mangles.
- Mangles Bay off Rockingham, Western Australia is named after the family.
