= Anigozanthos pulcherrimus =

Scientific classification
- Kingdom: Plantae
- Clade: Tracheophytes
- Clade: Angiosperms
- Clade: Monocots
- Clade: Commelinids
- Order: Commelinales
- Family: Haemodoraceae
- Genus: Anigozanthos
- Species: A. pulcherrimus

Binomial name
- Anigozanthos pulcherrimus Hook.
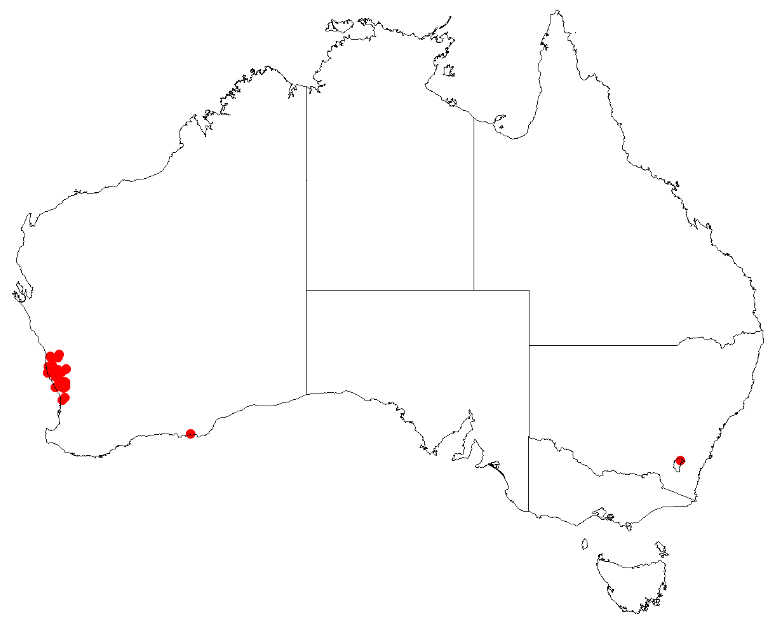
- Occurrence data from AVH

Species of flowering plant

Anigozanthos pulcherrimus or yellow kangaroo paw is a grass-like perennial herb that is native to Western Australia, from Perth to Geraldton. It can grow up to 1 m (3 ft 3 in) in height. Anigozanthos pulcherrimus has yellow flowers that appear from October to December.
