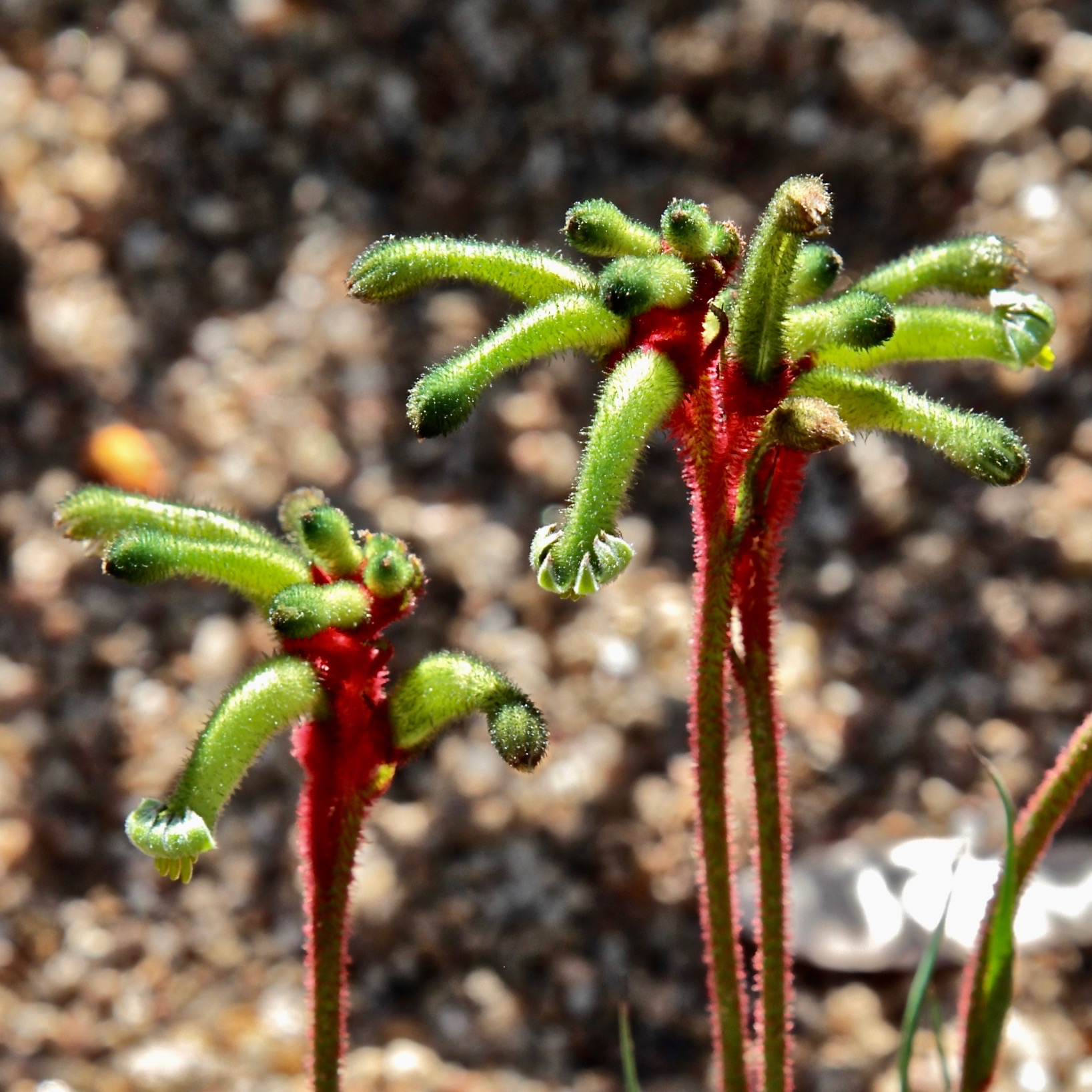
- Anigozanthos gabrielae from Western Australia: Albany, Avon Wheatbelt

Scientific classification
- Kingdom: Plantae
- Clade: Tracheophytes
- Clade: Angiosperms
- Clade: Monocots
- Clade: Commelinids
- Order: Commelinales
- Family: Haemodoraceae
- Genus: Anigozanthos
- Species: A. gabrielae

Binomial name
- Anigozanthos gabrielae Domin
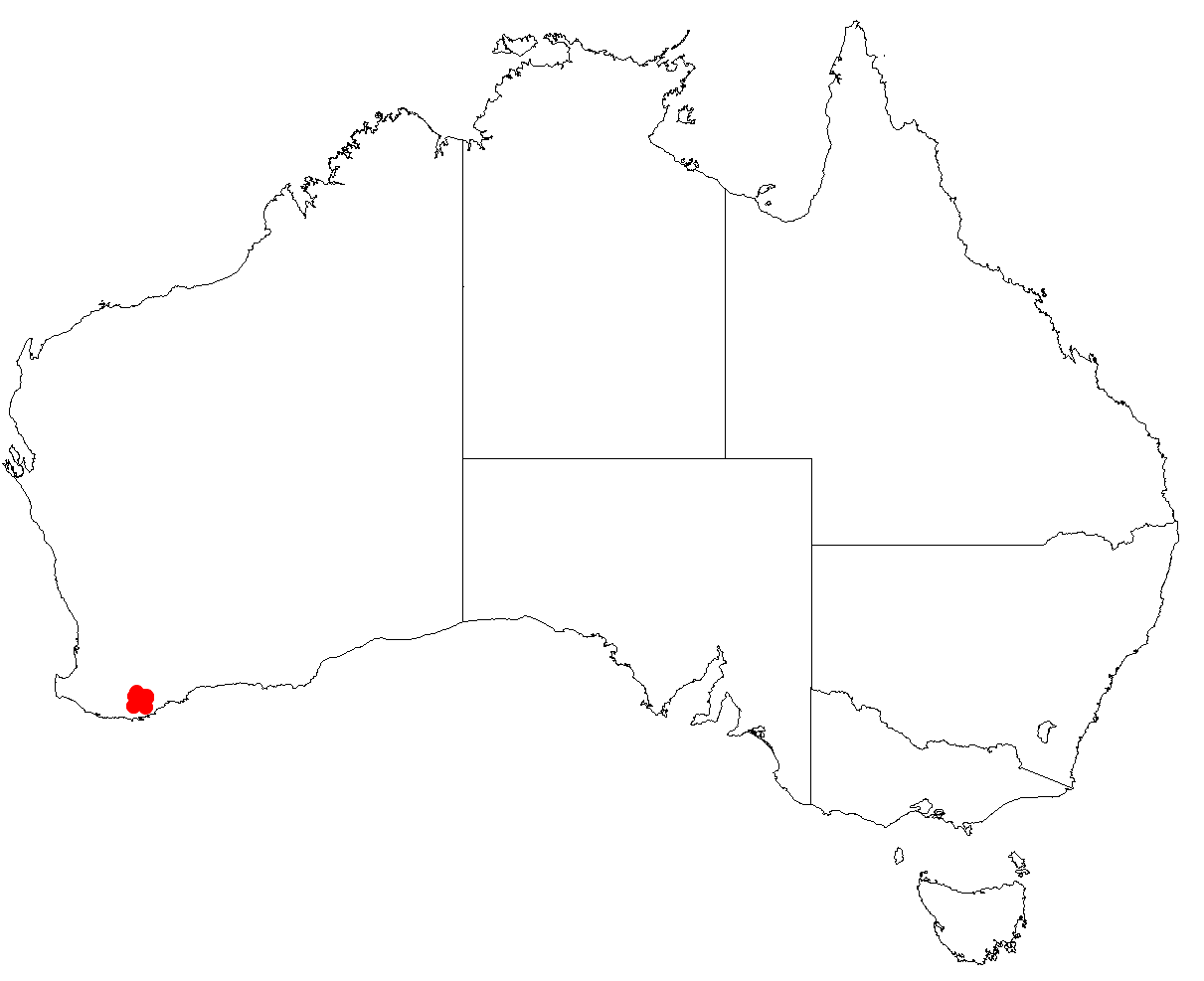
- Occurrence data from AVH

Synonyms
- There are no synonyms

= Anigozanthos gabrielae =

Species of flowering plant

Anigozanthos gabrielae is a species of Anigozanthos in the family Haemodoraceae known as dwarf kangaroo paw. This flowering, rhizomatous, perennial plant is endemic to Southwest Australia and grows on sand in areas which are wet in winter.

The species was first described by Karel Domin in the 1912 in the Journal of the Linnean Society, Botany.

== Description ==
Anigozanthos gabrielae has flat leaves, which are from 20 to 120 mm long and 0.8 to 3 mm wide. It has no hairs or bristles on the leaf margins, nor does it have hairs on the leaf surface. The scape is hairy, and from 90 to 230 mm long. A bract (9–30 mm long) subtends the inflorescence, which has several flowers. The bracts for each flower are 6.5–15 mm long and each flower is on a stem which is from 2 to 6.5 mm long, while the flowers are from 20 to 39 mm long. The perianth is hairy, and has bilateral symmetry. It is both red and green, with six tepals. There are six stamens, in pairs at three levels. The stamen filaments are 1.5-2.3 mm long, and the anthers are without an appendage and 1.5-2.4 mm long. Style 18–28 mm long. It flowers in September or October.

== Distribution ==
It is found in the following Interim Biogeographic Regionalisation of Australia (IBRA) regions: Avon Wheatbelt, Jarrah Forest, Mallee and Esperance Plains.
