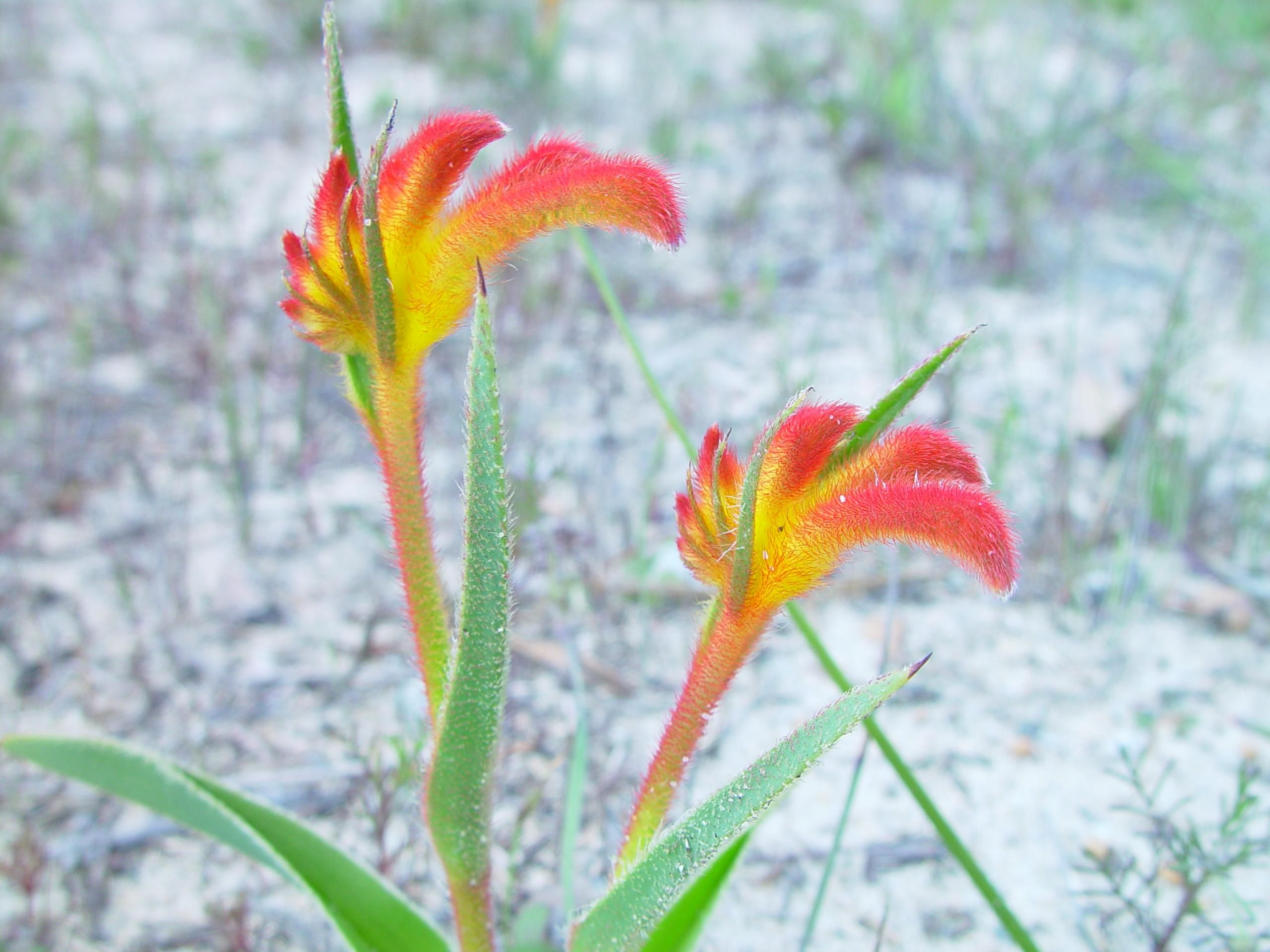

Scientific classification
- Kingdom: Plantae
- Clade: Tracheophytes
- Clade: Angiosperms
- Clade: Monocots
- Clade: Commelinids
- Order: Commelinales
- Family: Haemodoraceae
- Genus: Anigozanthos
- Species: A. bicolor

Binomial name
- Anigozanthos bicolor Endl.
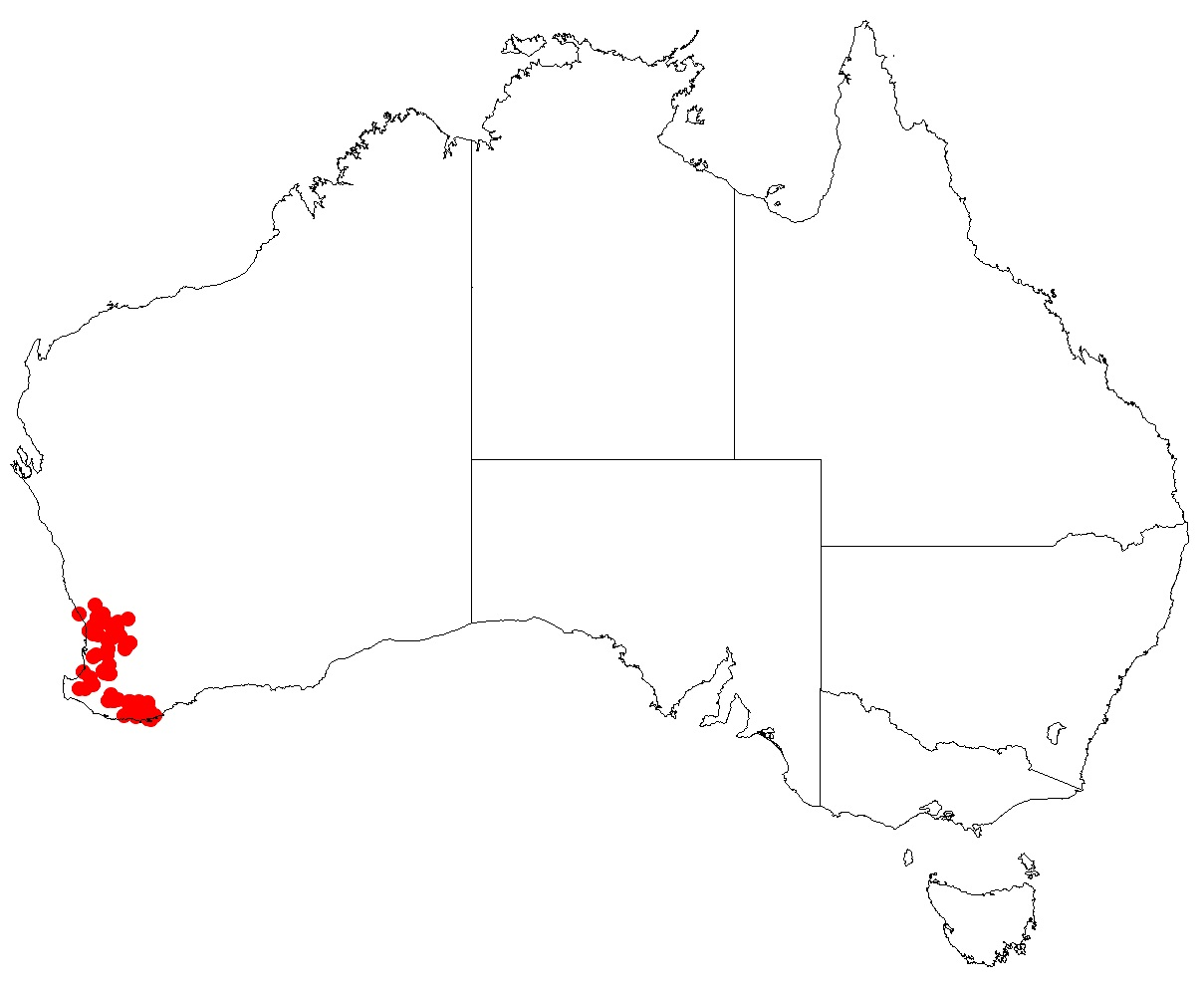
- Distribution of collections of Anigozanthos bicolor species from Australia's Virtual Herbarium

= Anigozanthos bicolor =

Little Kangaroo Paw

Species of flowering plant

Anigozanthos bicolor, commonly known as cat's paw, little kangaroo paw or two coloured kangaroo paw, is a grass-like perennial herb native to the south western coastal parts of Western Australia.

== Description ==
The rhizomatous plant typically grows to a height of 0.05 to 0.6 m (2.0 in to 1 ft 11.6 in) and blooms in spring between August and October producing green to yellow and red coloured flowers.

== Taxonomy ==
The species was first formally described by the botanist Stephan Endlicher in 1846 as a part of Johann Georg Christian Lehmann's work Haemodoraceae as published in Plantae Preissianae. The only synonyms are Agonizanthos bicolor and Anigosanthus bicolor.

There are four subspecies;

- Anigozanthos bicolor Endl. subsp. bicolor
- Anigozanthos bicolor subsp. decrescens as described by Stephen Hopper in 1987.
- Anigozanthos bicolor subsp. exstans as described by Stephen Hopper in 1987.
- Anigozanthos bicolor subsp. minor as described by Stephen Hopper in 1987.

== Distribution ==
It is found along the west coast from around Northam and Moora in the north down to around Albany in the south and has a discontinuous distribution to the east along the south coast as far as Cape Arid where it is commonly situated in damp or areas that are wet in winter or around granite outcrops or along road verges growing in clay, loam or sandy soils over granite or laterite as a part of open forest or low heathland communities.
