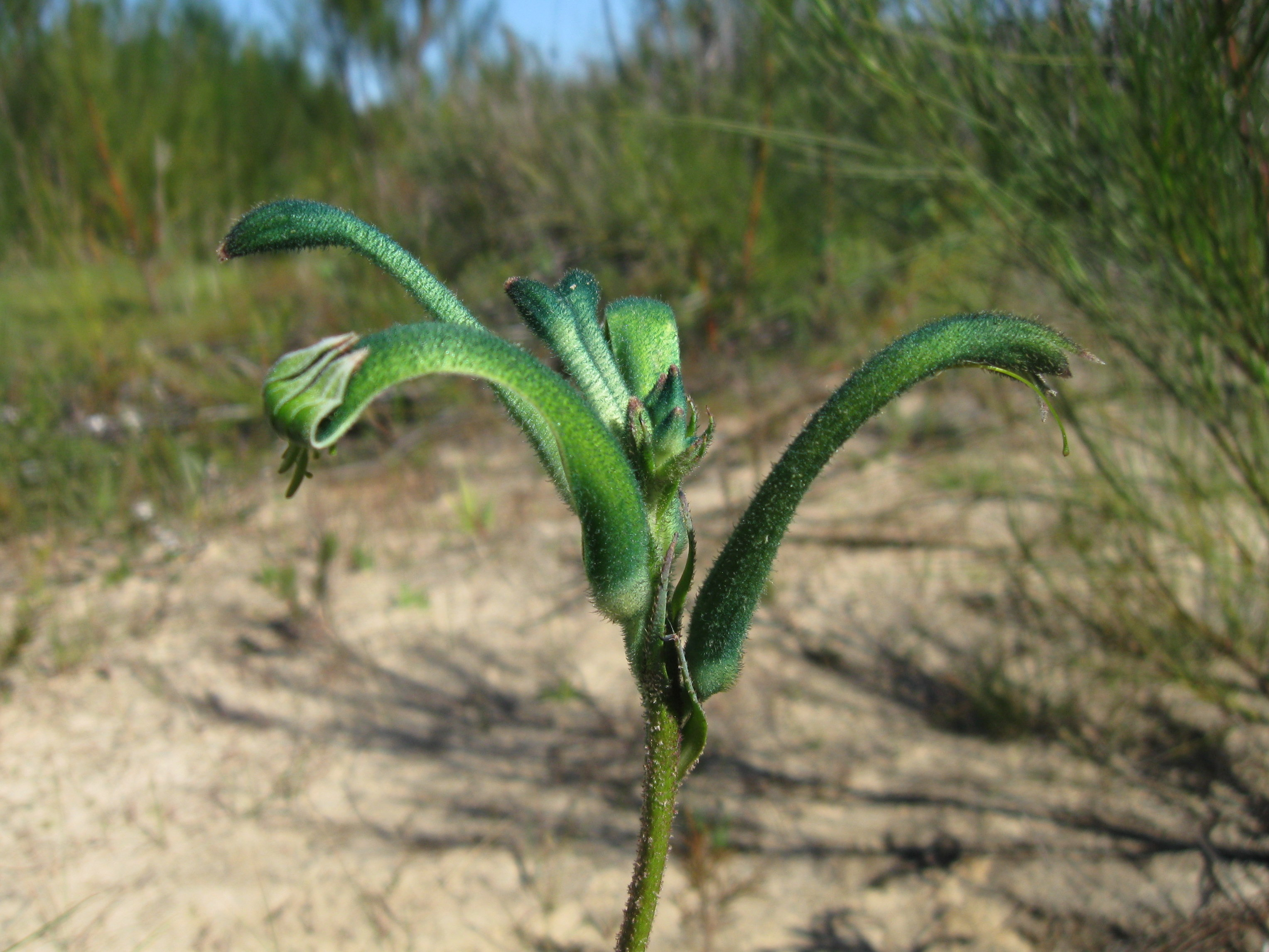

Scientific classification
- Kingdom: Plantae
- Clade: Tracheophytes
- Clade: Angiosperms
- Clade: Monocots
- Clade: Commelinids
- Order: Commelinales
- Family: Haemodoraceae
- Genus: Anigozanthos
- Species: A. viridis

Binomial name
- Anigozanthos viridis Endl.
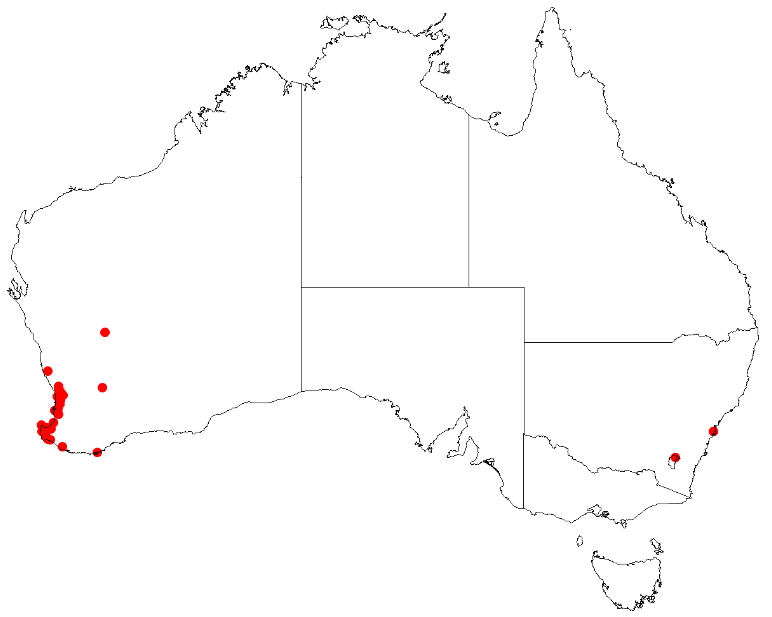
- Occurrence data from AVH

= Anigozanthos viridis =

Green Kangaroo Paw

Species of flowering plant

Anigozanthos viridis, commonly known as Green Kangaroo Paw, is a grass-like perennial herb native to south western coastal regions of Western Australia. The Noongar peoples know the plant as Koroylbardany.

== Description ==
The rhizomatous plant typically grows to a height of 0.05 to 0.85 m (2.0 in to 2 ft 9.5 in) and blooms in spring between August and October producing green or yellow-green flowers. The only synonym is Anigosanthus viridis.

== Taxonomy ==
The species was first formally described by the botanist Stephan Endlicher in 1846 as a part of Johann Georg Christian Lehmann's work on Haemodoraceae, published in Plantae Preissianae.

There are two subspecies;

- Anigozanthos viridis subsp. terraspectans described by Stephen Hopper in 1987. Dwarf green kangaroo paw
- Anigozanthos viridis Endl. subsp. viridis. Green kangaroo paw

The specific epithet is taken from the Latin word viridis meaning green.

== Distribution ==
It is found along the west coast from around Gingin in the north down to around Augusta in the south where it is commonly situated in damp or areas that are wet in winter growing in clay, loam or sandy soils.

== Uses ==
The Noongar peoples used the roots of the plant as a food source, which they either roasted or ate raw.
