= Anigozanthos kalbarriensis =

Kalbarri catspaw

Scientific classification
- Kingdom: Plantae
- Clade: Tracheophytes
- Clade: Angiosperms
- Clade: Monocots
- Clade: Commelinids
- Order: Commelinales
- Family: Haemodoraceae
- Genus: Anigozanthos
- Species: A. kalbarriensis

Binomial name
- Anigozanthos kalbarriensis Hopper
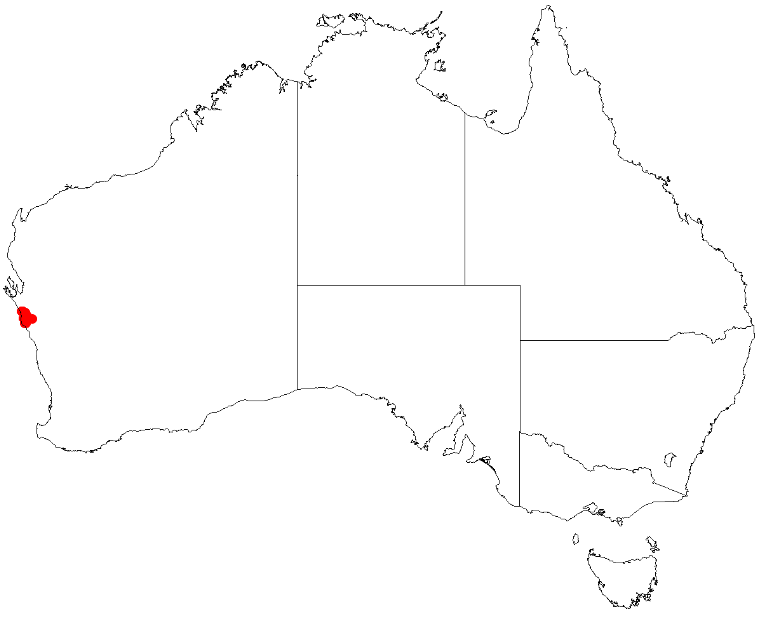
- Occurrence data from AVH

Species of flowering plant

Anigozanthos kalbarriensis, commonly known as Kalbarri catspaw, is a grass-like perennial herb native to the south western coastal parts of Western Australia.

== Description ==
The rhizomatous plant typically grows to a height of 0.1 to 0.2 m (3.9 in to 7.9 in) and blooms in spring between August and September producing red or green or yellow coloured flowers.

== Distribution ==
It is found in a small area on the west coast of Western Australia in the Mid West region from around Kalbarri and Northampton where it is commonly situated in damp or areas that are wet in winter growing in a variety of soils.
