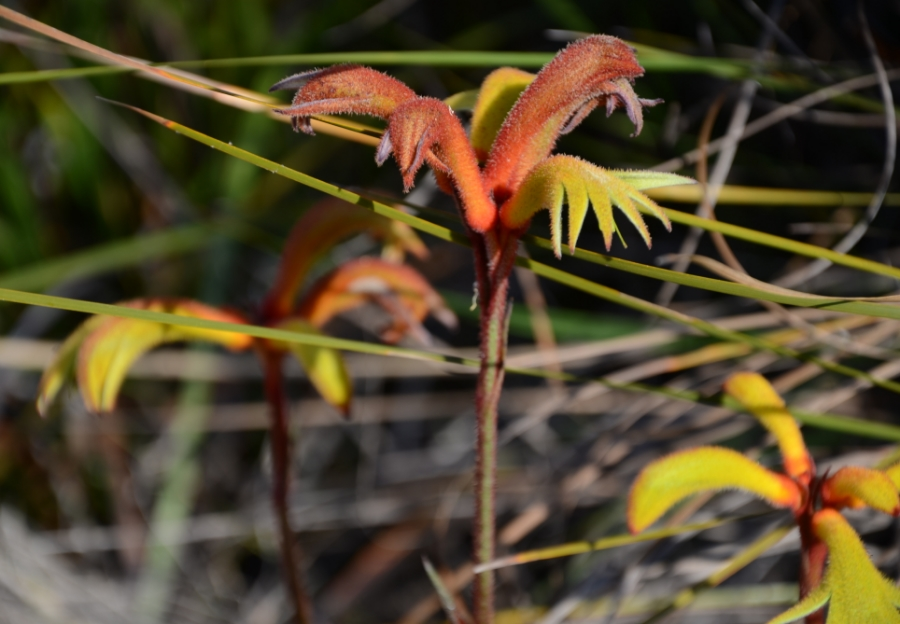

Scientific classification
- Kingdom: Plantae
- Clade: Tracheophytes
- Clade: Angiosperms
- Clade: Monocots
- Clade: Commelinids
- Order: Commelinales
- Family: Haemodoraceae
- Genus: Anigozanthos
- Species: A. preissii

Binomial name
- Anigozanthos preissii Endl.

= Anigozanthos preissii =

Species of flowering plant

Anigozanthos preissii, the Albany cat's paw, is a herbaceous plant species in the family Haemodoraceae, endemic to Western Australia.

The species is an upright perennial herb, with long leaves that emerge from a rhizome beneath the soil. A tall stalk emerges from the centre of these to present large red, orange and yellow flowers. The flowering period is sometime between October and November, when attains a height up to 0.8 metres. The leaves grey-green and arranged in a rosette at ground level.

It occurs in a range to the north and east of Albany, especially in the Warren region, along the southern coast of Southwest Australia.

Anigozanthos preissii was first described by Stephan Endlicher, in Lehmann's Plantae Preissianae, using the variant spelling Anigosanthus. The epithet is named for the botanist Ludwig Preiss.
