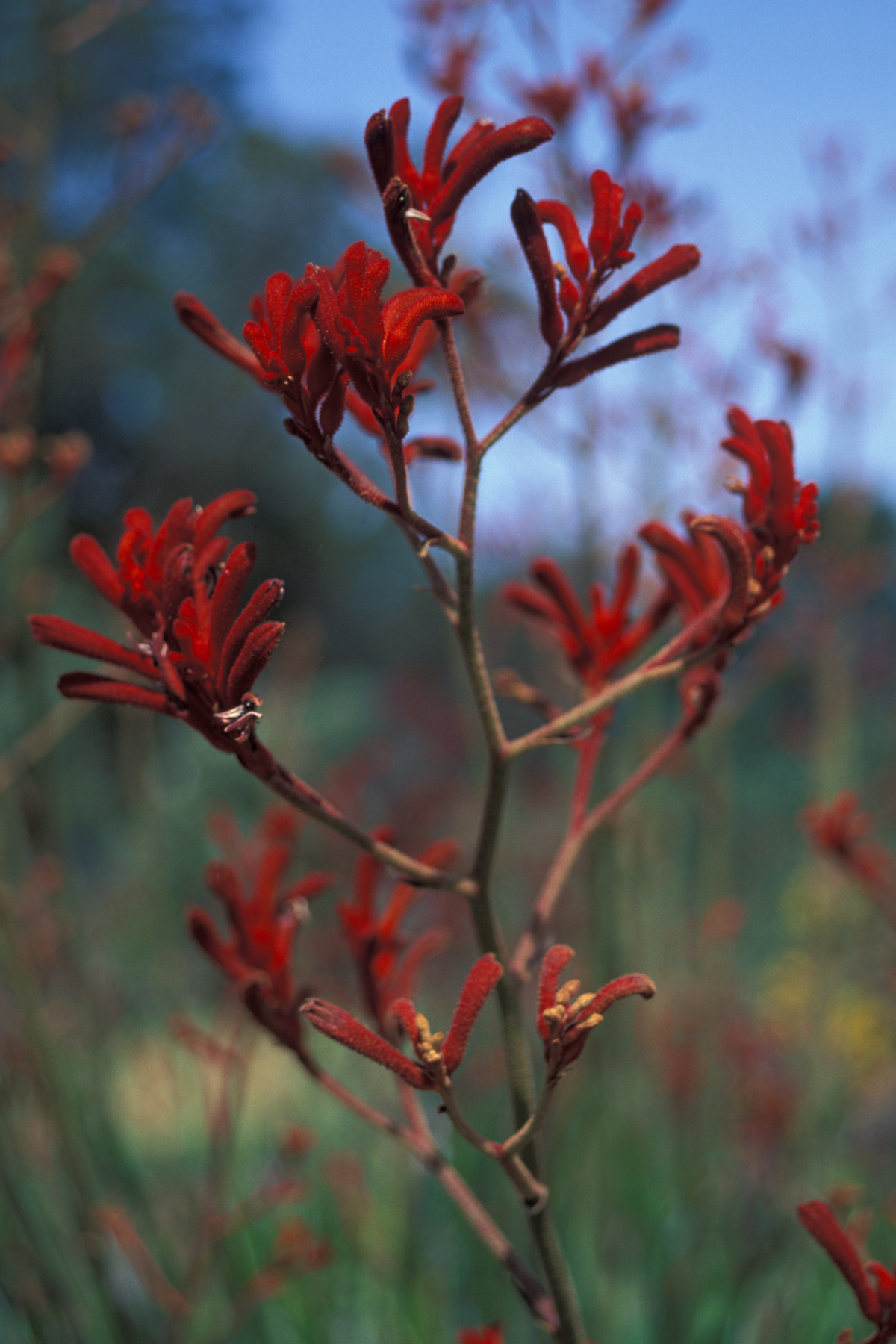

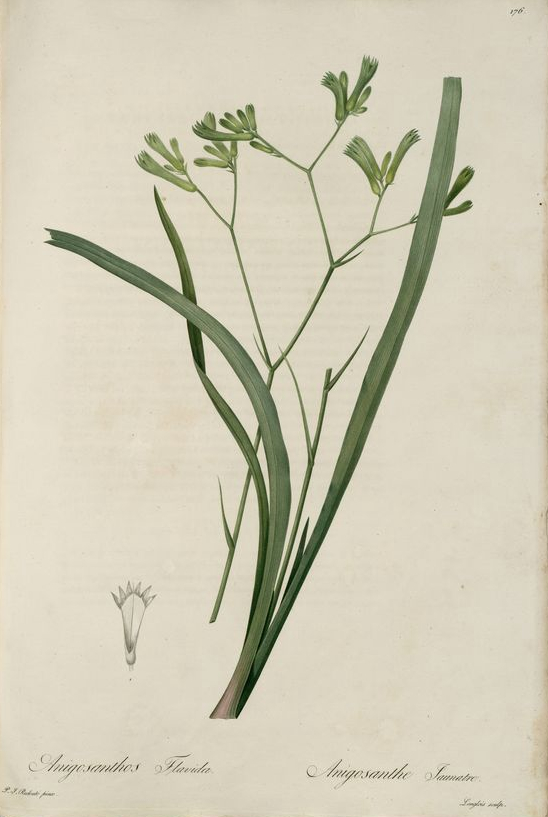
- Redouté's illustration, Les Liliacees t. 176

Scientific classification
- Kingdom: Plantae
- Clade: Tracheophytes
- Clade: Angiosperms
- Clade: Monocots
- Clade: Commelinids
- Order: Commelinales
- Family: Haemodoraceae
- Genus: Anigozanthos
- Species: A. flavidus

Binomial name
- Anigozanthos flavidus DC.
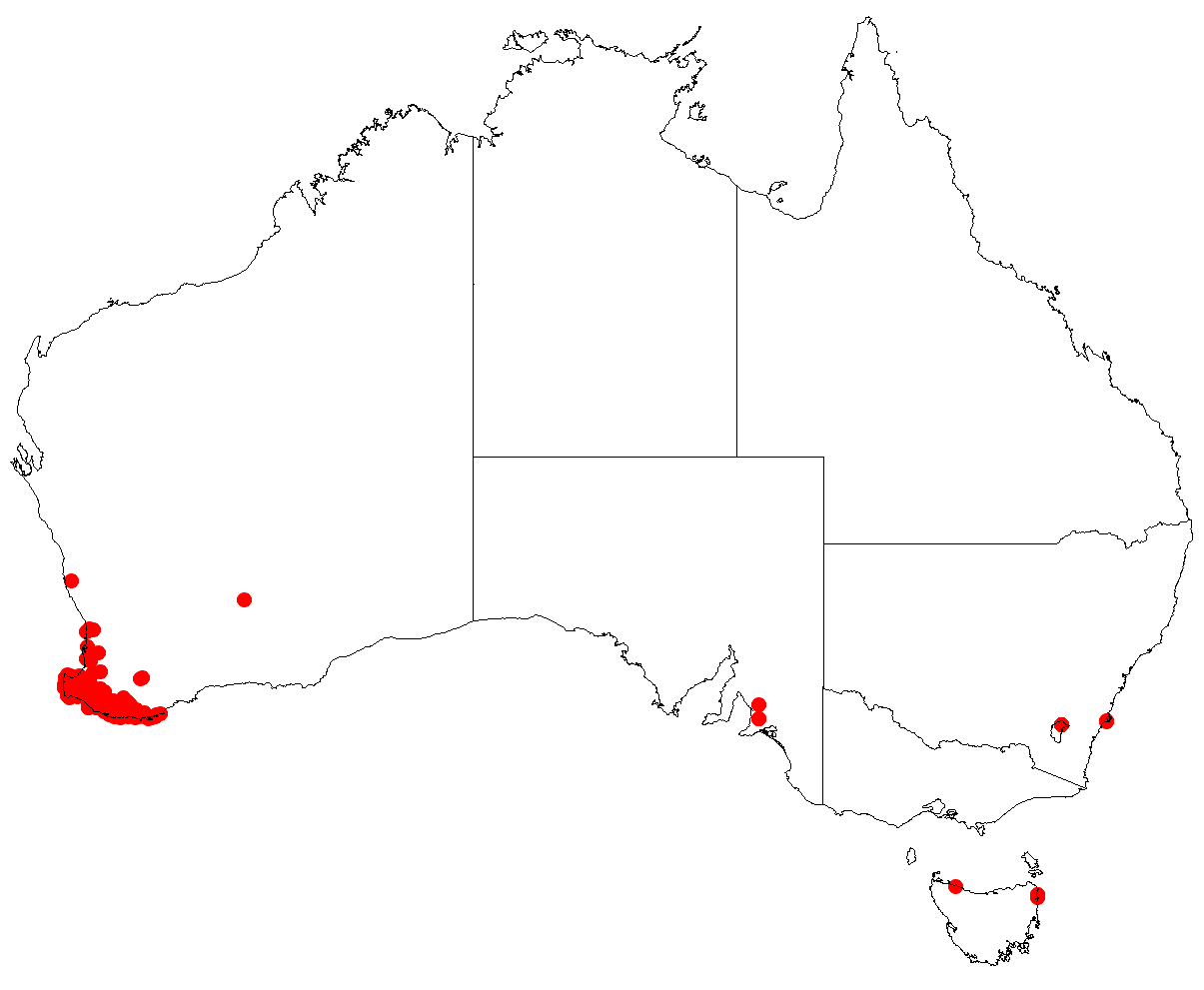
- Occurrence data from AVH

= Anigozanthos flavidus =

Species of plant found in Southwest Australia

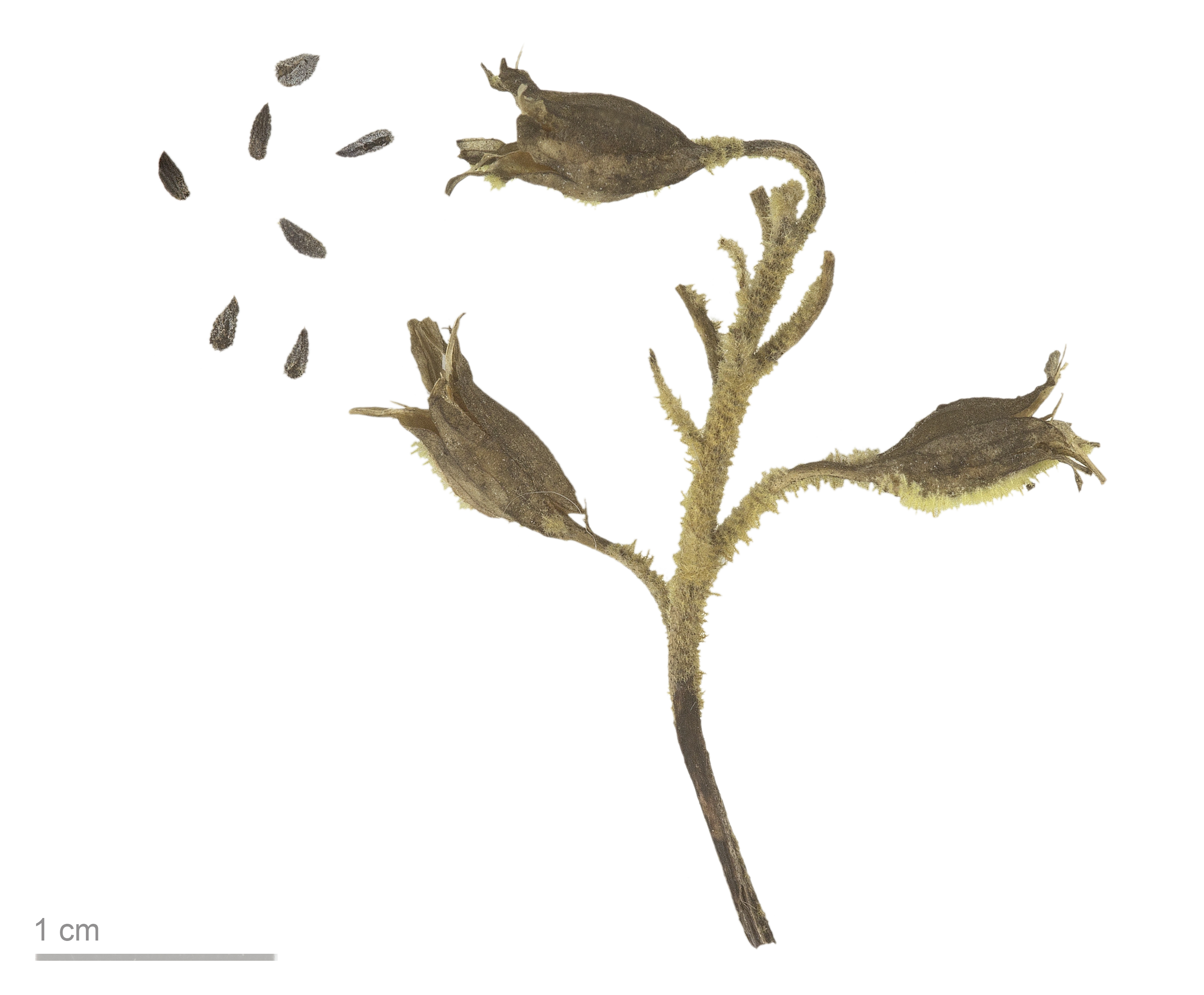
Anigozanthos flavidus

Anigozanthos flavidus is a species of plant found in Southwest Australia. It is member of the Haemodoraceae family. It is commonly known as the tall, yellow, or evergreen, kangaroo paw. The specific epithet, flavidus, refers to the yellow flowers of this plant.

A member of the genus Anigozanthos (kangaroo- and cats-paws) that has an evergreen clump of strap-like leaves, up to 1 metre long and 0.02 m wide, growing from an underground rhizome around 0.05 m in diameter. The rhizome allows the species to regenerate after drought or fire. Each plant may produce over 350 flowers, on up to 10 long stems, these appear during the summer of the region. Pollen is distributed by birds as they plunge into the flowers to reach the nectaries. Flowers are frequently yellow and green, but may present in shades of red, pink, orange, or brown. It is found along roadsides, along creeks, and in forests and swamps, and other unshaded winterwet habitat.

The species occurs in a range from Two Peoples Bay in the southeast, throughout the Warren and southern Jarrah Forest, to Waroona on the Swan Coastal Plain. It was previously endemic to the region, but is now naturalised in New South Wales. This kangaroo paw is now widely cultivated in the Eastern states of Australia and the United States of America. Anigozanthos flavidus hybridises with other members of the genus, and is used in the development of cultivars. It is a hardy plant, tolerant of a wide range of soil types and condition, that may live for around 30 years in a garden. It is propagated from seed or sections of the rhizome.

The first description of the species was by Augustin Pyramus de Candolle in 1807. This was published in Redouté's Les Liliacees with an illustration by that artist.
