= Anigozanthos rufus =

Species of flowering plant

Anigozanthos rufus is a grass-like evergreen perennial plant native to the southern coasts of Western Australia. Common names include red kangaroo paw, crimson kangaroo paw, and backdraft.

== Description ==
The red kangaroo paw grows to a height of 0.2 to 1 m (7.9 in to 3 ft 3.4 in) Making a small shrub. The grass-like plant has green and grey flat, strappy leaves that are 17 to 28 cm (6.7 to 11.0 in) long. It produces long red to purple to yellow coloured flowers in spring and early summer from August to January. The tubular flowers have a velvety texture and form dense heads at the end.

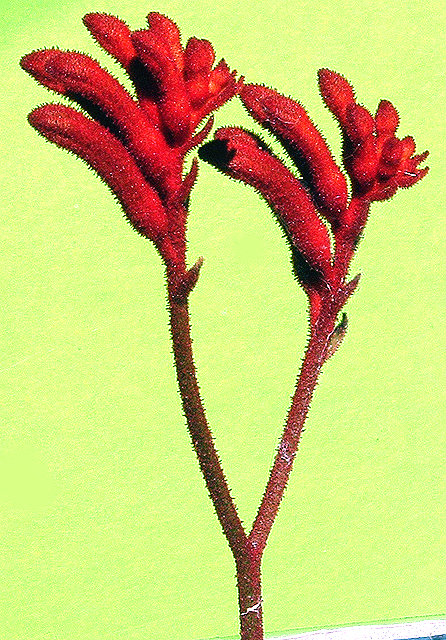

== Taxonomy ==
The species was first formally described by the botanist Jacques Labillardière in 1800 as part of the work Relation du Voyage à la Recherche de la Perouse. Synonyms include Schwaegrichenia rufa, Agonizanthos rufa and Anigozanthos tyrianthinus.

== Distribution ==
The plant is often situated in seasonally wet areas growing in sandy soils along the south coast from around Albany in the west to around Cape Arid in the east.

== Cultivation ==
It is commercially available in pots or seed form and is suitable for small gardens or as a border plant and is also suitable as a pot plant but needs to be moved indoors for the winter months in cooler areas. Once it is established it is drought tolerant, grows in full sun or shade and moderately frost tolerant. The plant needs space for plenty of air flow around the base to assist to prevent Ink disease which blackens the leaf blade. Clumps of the plant can be divided in the summer.
