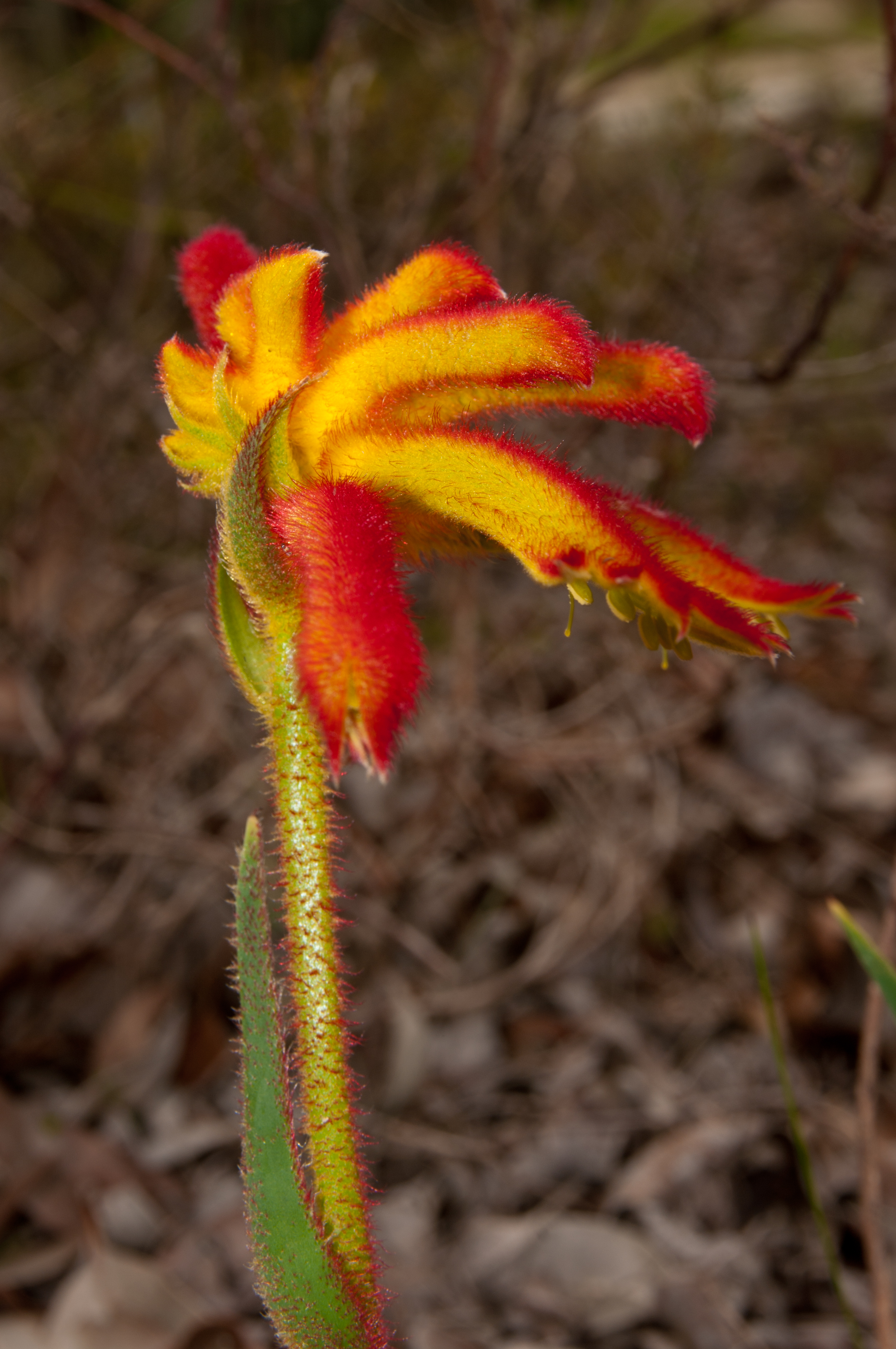

Scientific classification
- Kingdom: Plantae
- Clade: Tracheophytes
- Clade: Angiosperms
- Clade: Monocots
- Clade: Commelinids
- Order: Commelinales
- Family: Haemodoraceae
- Genus: Anigozanthos
- Species: A. humilis

Binomial name
- Anigozanthos humilis Lindl.
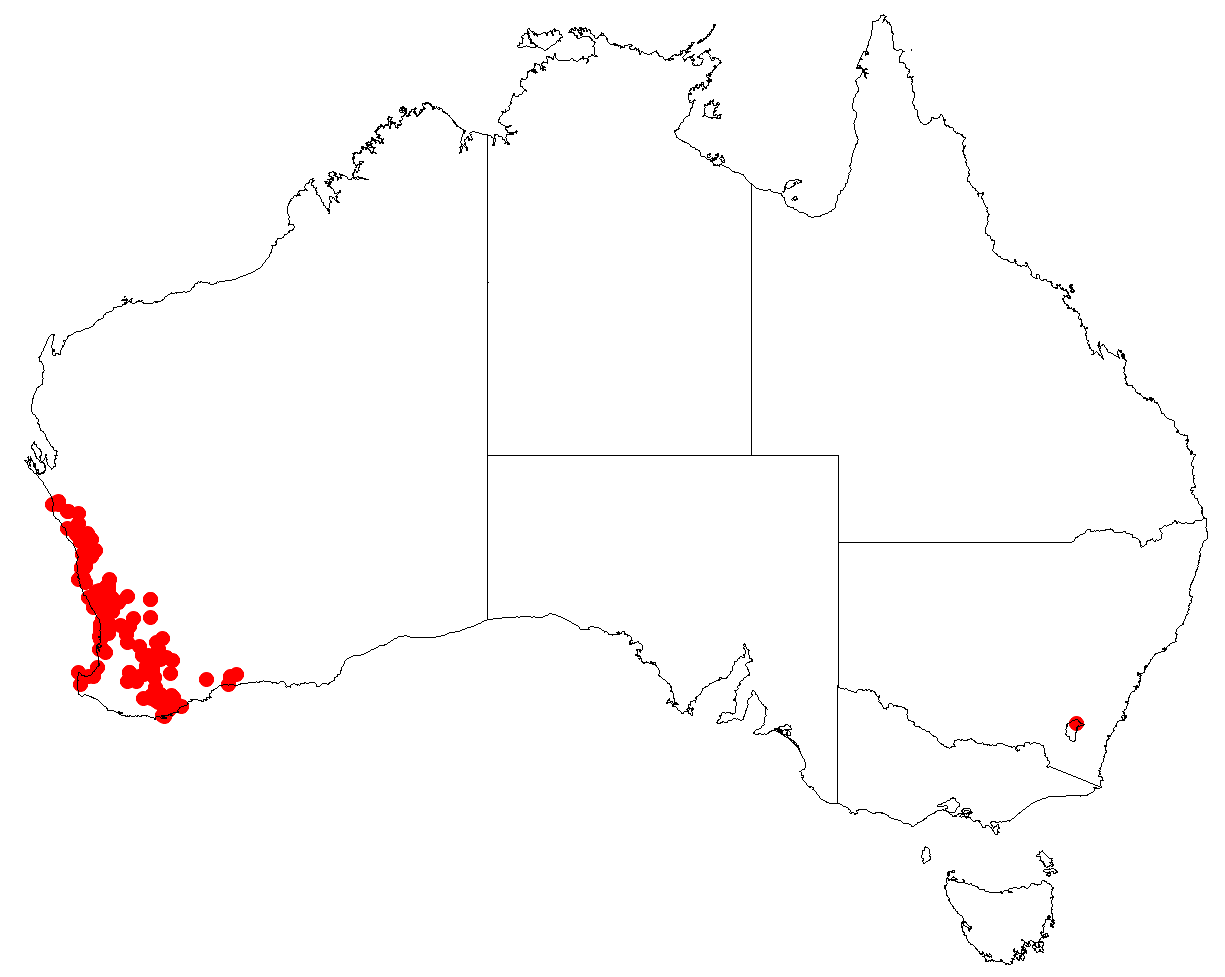
- Occurrence data from AVH

Synonyms
- Anigozanthos dorrienii Domin; Anigozanthos minimus Lehm.; Anigozanthus minima Lehm. nom. inval.

= Anigozanthos humilis =

Species of flowering plant

Anigozanthos humilis is a species of Anigozanthos in the family Haemodoraceae. This flowering perennial plant is endemic to Southwest Australia and widespread in its open forests. Common names include catspaw and common catspaw.

== Taxonomy ==
The species was first described by John Lindley in the 1840 work A sketch of the vegetation of the Swan River Colony. Three subspecies have also been described and recognised. The genus name Anigozanthos possibly combines Ancient Greek words "anisos", meaning unequal, and "anthos", meaning flower (in reference to the shape of the flowers). The specific epithet, humilis, means "low-growing".

The common name catspaw was initially applied to this species, then for several other species of Anigozanthos, this is assumed to have been coined to contrast these with larger flowers and scapes of 'kangaroo paws'. The widely occurring A. humilis subsp. humilis is referred to as the common catspaw.

== Description ==
The species has a basal rosette of long strap-like leaves, emerging at the soil's surface from a rhizome beneath. A raceme of flowers appear at the terminus of long stalks, giving the plant a height up to one metre. The tuberous form of the flower bud is yellow, becoming orange then red at the opening. It is typically 0.4-1 meter tall and 0.3-0.6 meters across.

== Conservation status ==
While the subspecies Anigozanthos humilis subsp. humilis is common, and unthreatened, the rarer subspecies described by Stephen Hopper are listed with a conservation status. Anigozanthos humilis subsp. Badgingarra is listed by the Dept of Environment and Conservation as poorly known. and the subspecies Anigozanthos humilis subsp. chrysanthus, the golden catspaw, has been listed as rare by the same body.

== Cultivation ==
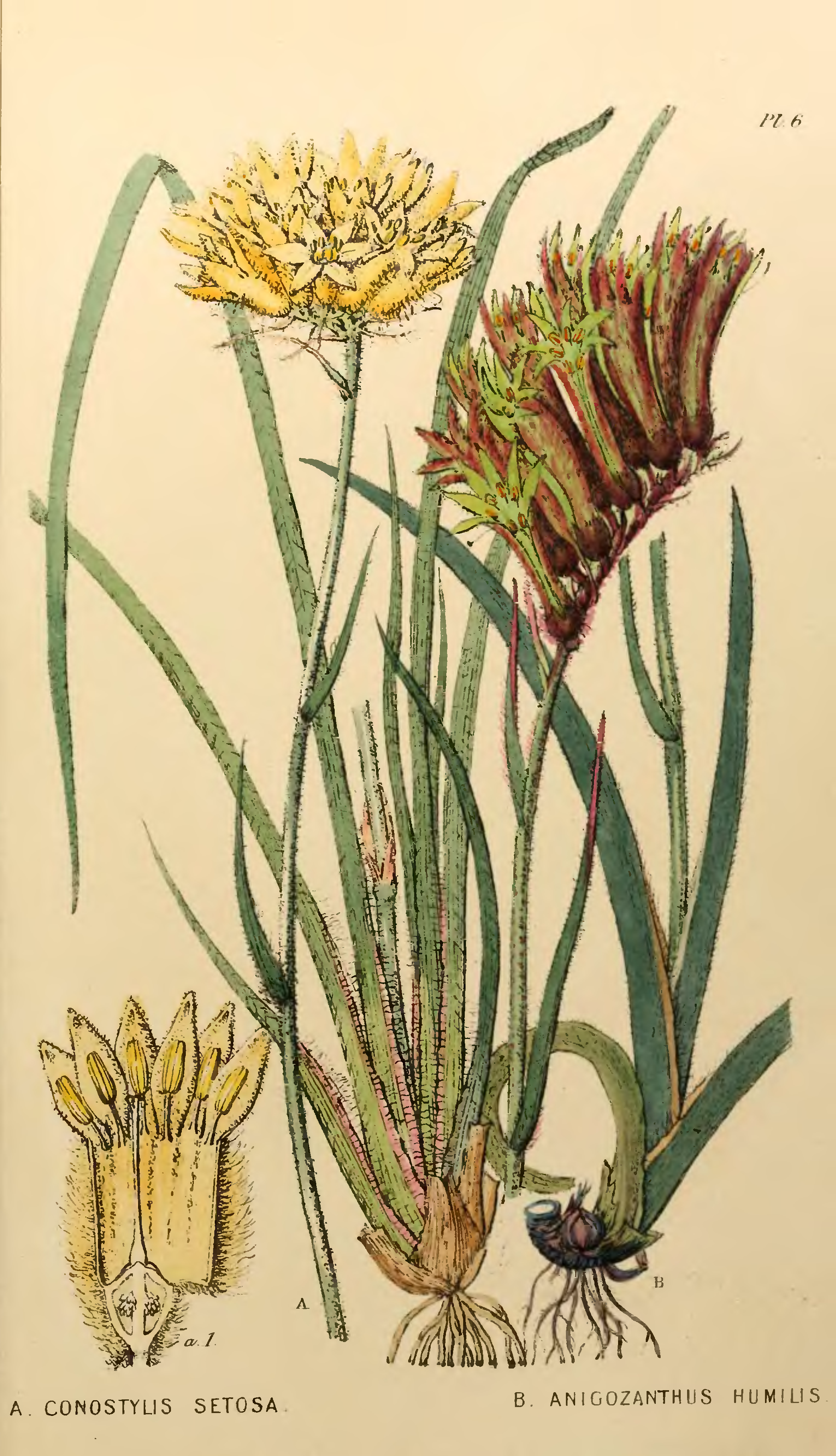
A sketch of the vegetation of the Swan River Colony, 1839, John Lindley

The plant is widely cultivated, and is able to tolerate hot and humid climates, but requires winter protection in temperate regions. It has gained the Royal Horticultural Society's Award of Garden Merit. It does best in sunny locations with well-drained soil.
