= Leioproctus haemodori =

Scientific classification
- Kingdom: Animalia
- Phylum: Arthropoda
- Clade: Pancrustacea
- Class: Insecta
- Order: Hymenoptera
- Family: Colletidae
- Genus: Leioproctus
- Species: L. haemodori

Binomial name
- Leioproctus haemodori Batley & Houston, 2023

Species of bee

Leioproctus haemodori, or Leioproctus (Leioproctus) haemodori, is a species of bee in the family Colletidae and subfamily Colletinae. It is endemic to Australia. It was described by entomologists Michael Batley and Terry Houston in 2023.

== Etymology ==
The specific epithet haemodori alludes to the close association of the species with the plant genus Haemodorum.

== Description ==
The holotype male body length is 10.3 mm, head width 3.62 mm; female body length 10.5 mm, head width 3.7 mm. Integumental colouration is mainly black with brown markings. The hair is white to brown.

== Distribution and habitat ==
The species occurs in south-west Western Australia. The type locality is Greenmount National Park.

== Behaviour ==
The adults are flying mellivores. Flowering plants visited by the bees include Haemodorum venosum, Haemodorum simulans and Haemodorum spicatum.
