= Leioproctus aureofimbriatus =

Scientific classification
- Kingdom: Animalia
- Phylum: Arthropoda
- Clade: Pancrustacea
- Class: Insecta
- Order: Hymenoptera
- Family: Colletidae
- Genus: Leioproctus
- Species: L. aureofimbriatus

Binomial name
- Leioproctus aureofimbriatus Batley & Houston, 2023

Species of bee

Leioproctus aureofimbriatus, or Leioproctus (Leioproctus) aureofimbriatus, is a species of bee in the family Colletidae and subfamily Colletinae. It is endemic to Australia. It was described by entomologists Michael Batley and Terry Houston in 2023.

== Etymology ==
The specific epithet aureofimbriatus (Latin: "with a golden fringe") is an anatomical reference to "fringes on the fore basitarsus and S5 of the male".

== Description ==
The holotype male body length is 10.8 mm, head width 3.6 mm; female body length 12.5 mm, head width 3.8 mm. Integumental colouration is mainly black with brown to orange-brown markings. The hair is white to gold and brown.

== Distribution and habitat ==
The species occurs in north-eastern New South Wales from Sydney northwards to the Queensland border. The type locality is the Gibraltar Range National Park.

== Behaviour ==
The adults are flying mellivores. Flowering plants visited by the bees include Haemodorum planifolium.

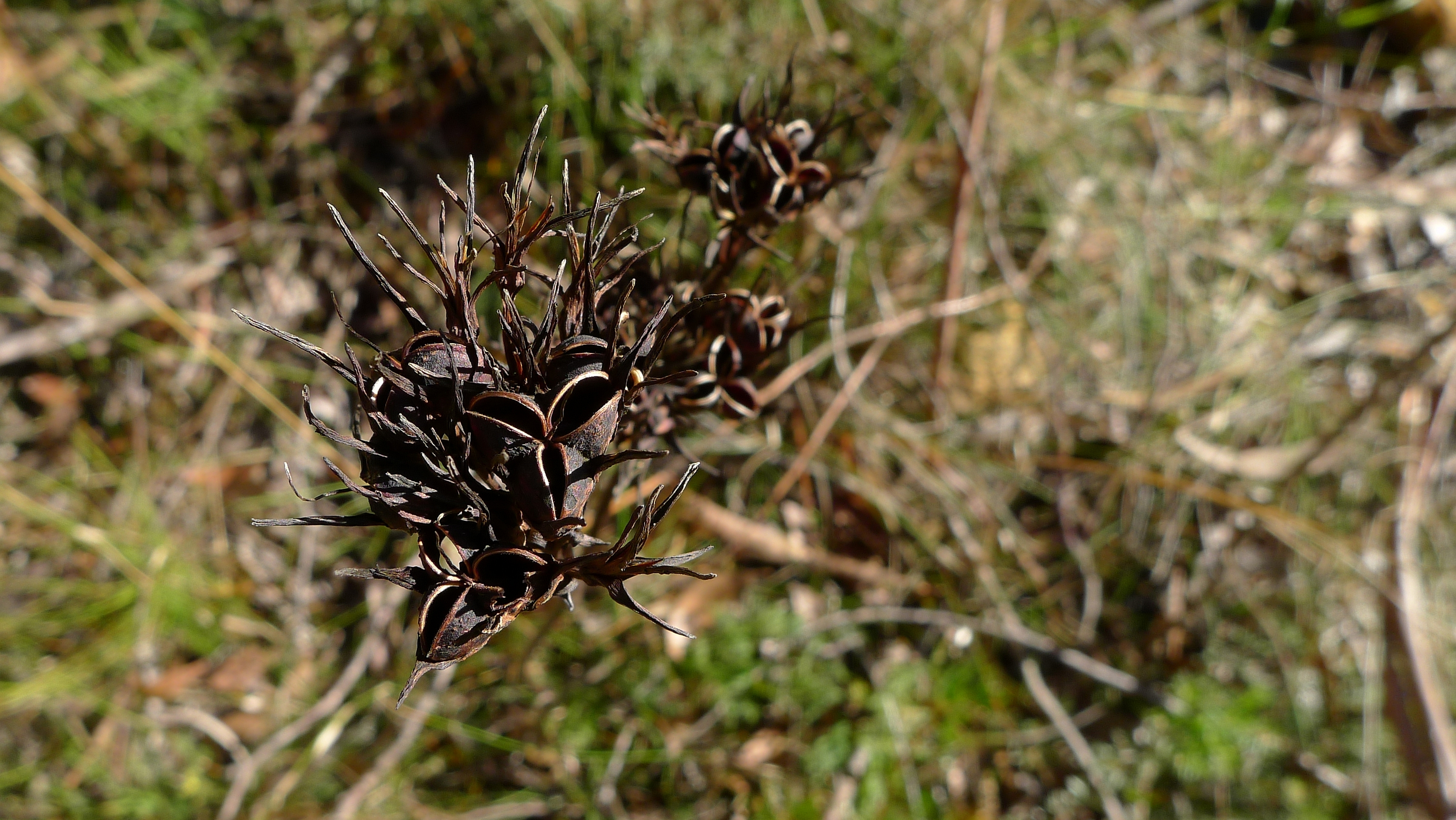
Haemodorum planifolium (strap-leaf bloodroot), a forage plant of the bees
