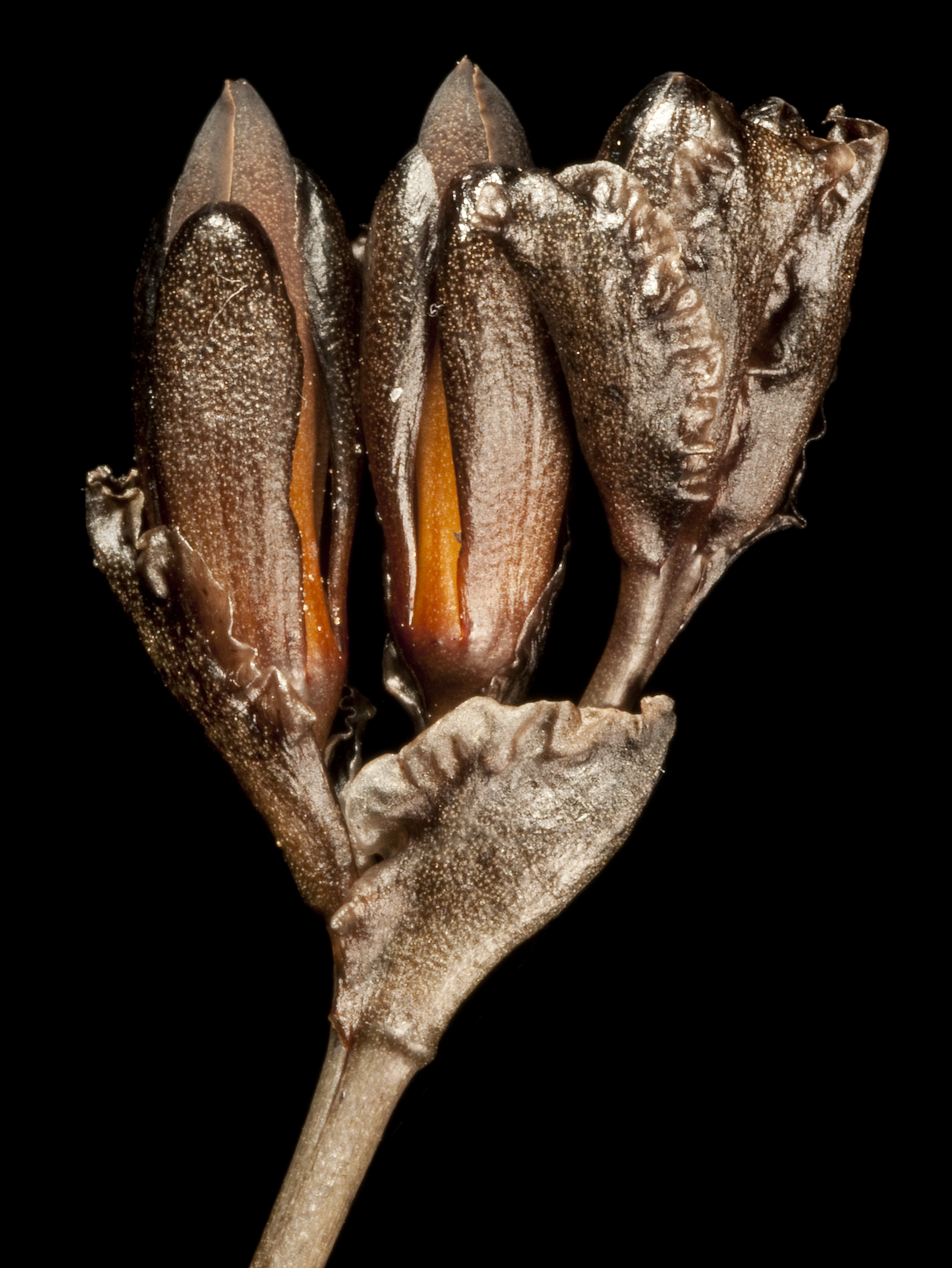

Scientific classification
- Kingdom: Plantae
- Clade: Tracheophytes
- Clade: Angiosperms
- Clade: Monocots
- Clade: Commelinids
- Order: Commelinales
- Family: Haemodoraceae
- Genus: Haemodorum
- Species: H. laxum

Binomial name
- Haemodorum laxum R.Br.
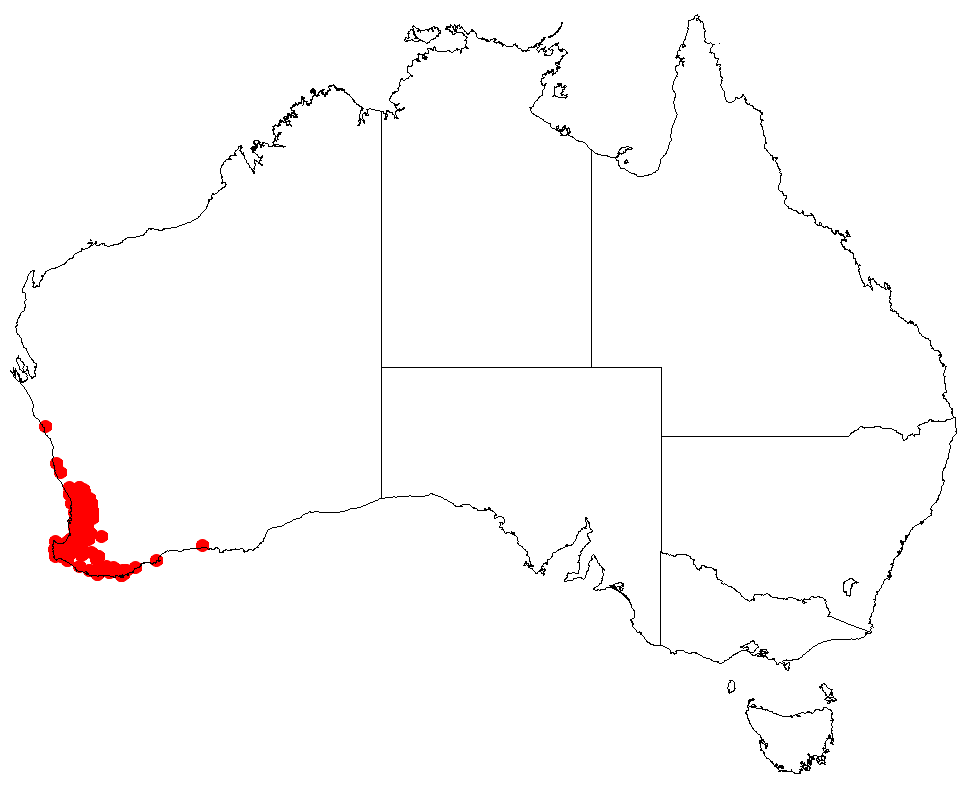

= Haemodorum laxum =

Species of flowering plant

Haemodorum laxum is a plant in the Haemodoraceae (blood root) family, native to Western Australia, and was first described by Robert Brown in 1810.

It is a perennial, herb, growing from 0.6-1.4 m high.
