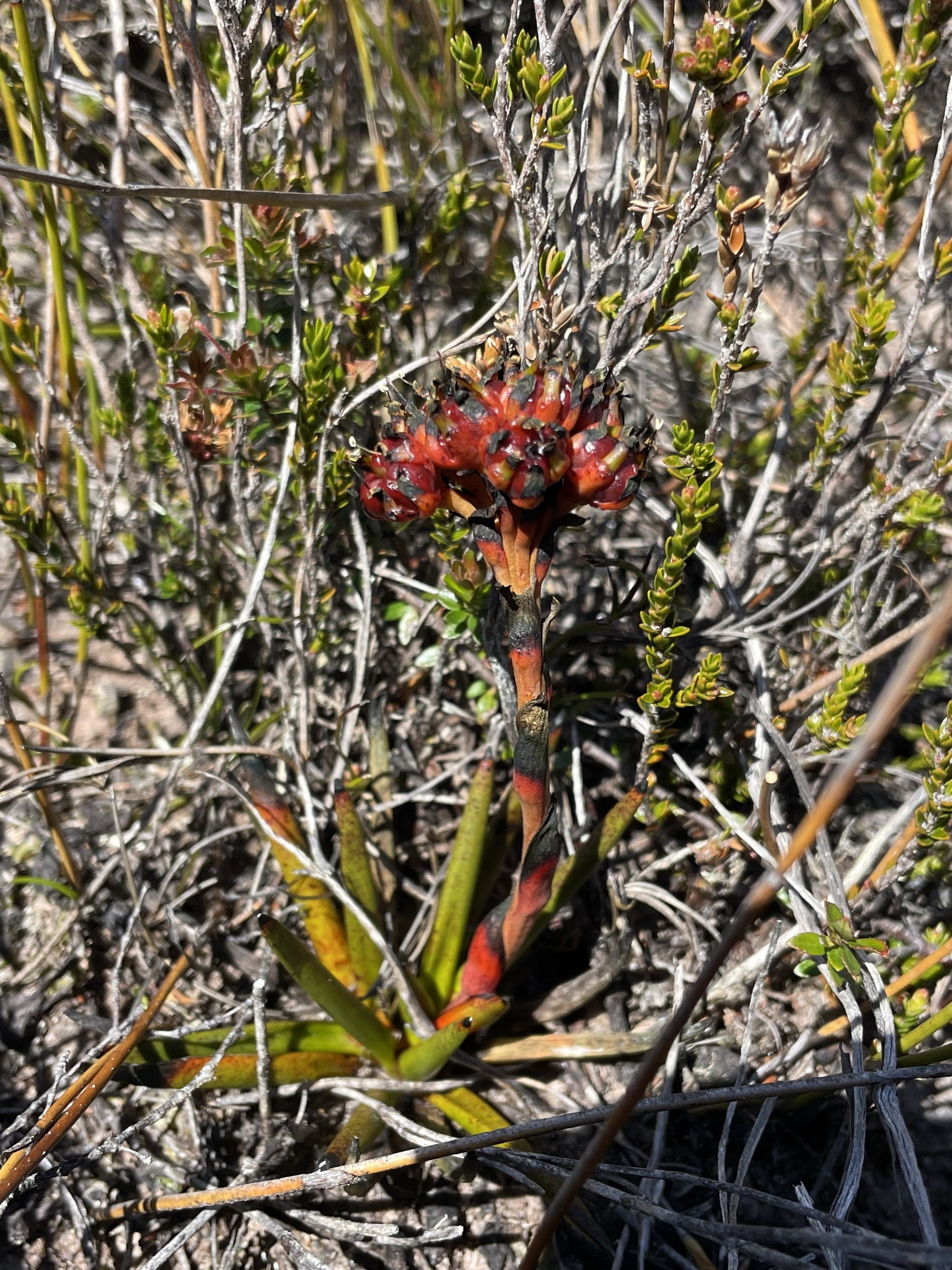
- Growing in Southwest National Park, Tasmania
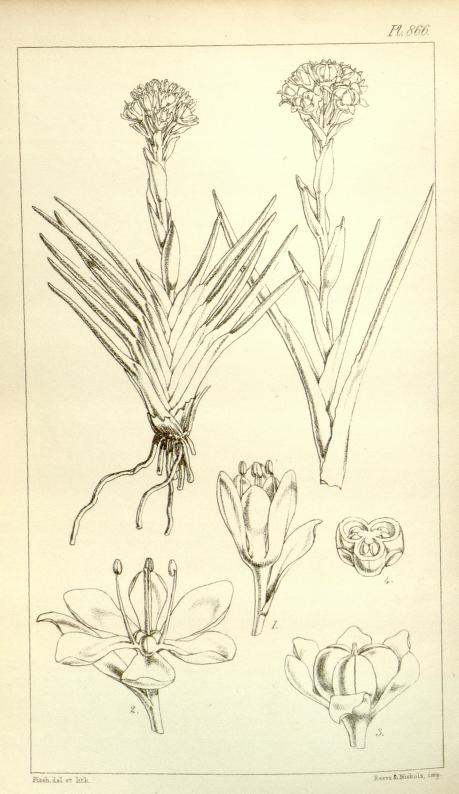
- Plate 866, Icones Plantarum.

Scientific classification
- Kingdom: Plantae
- Clade: Tracheophytes
- Clade: Angiosperms
- Clade: Monocots
- Clade: Commelinids
- Order: Commelinales
- Family: Haemodoraceae
- Genus: Haemodorum
- Species: H. distichophyllum

Binomial name
- Haemodorum distichophyllum Hook.
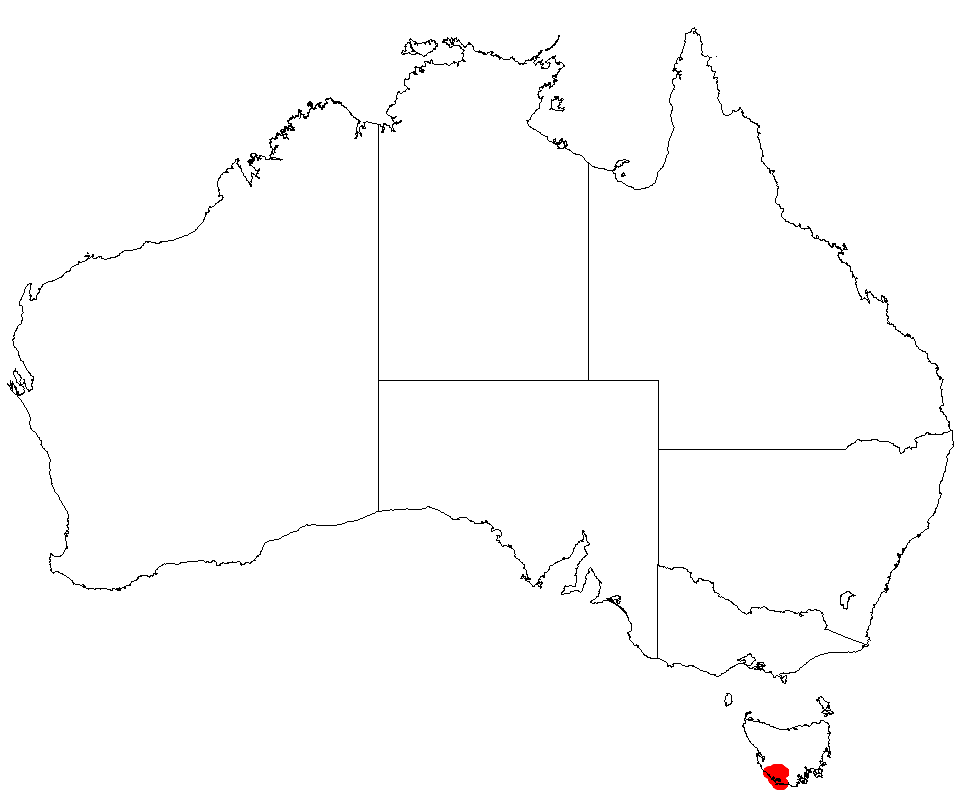
- Occurrence data from the Australasian Virtual Herbarium

= Haemodorum distichophyllum =

Species of flowering plant

Haemodorum distichophyllum, also known as the Moorland Bloodroot, is a plant in the Haemodoraceae (blood root) family, native to Tasmania. It was first described by William Jackson Hooker in 1852, from a specimen collected at Macquarie Harbour by Ronald Gunn in 1846.

It is a very low growing plant, growing to heights of 3 cm to 9.5 cm. It is found in heath and button grass plains of western Tasmania at various altitudes.
