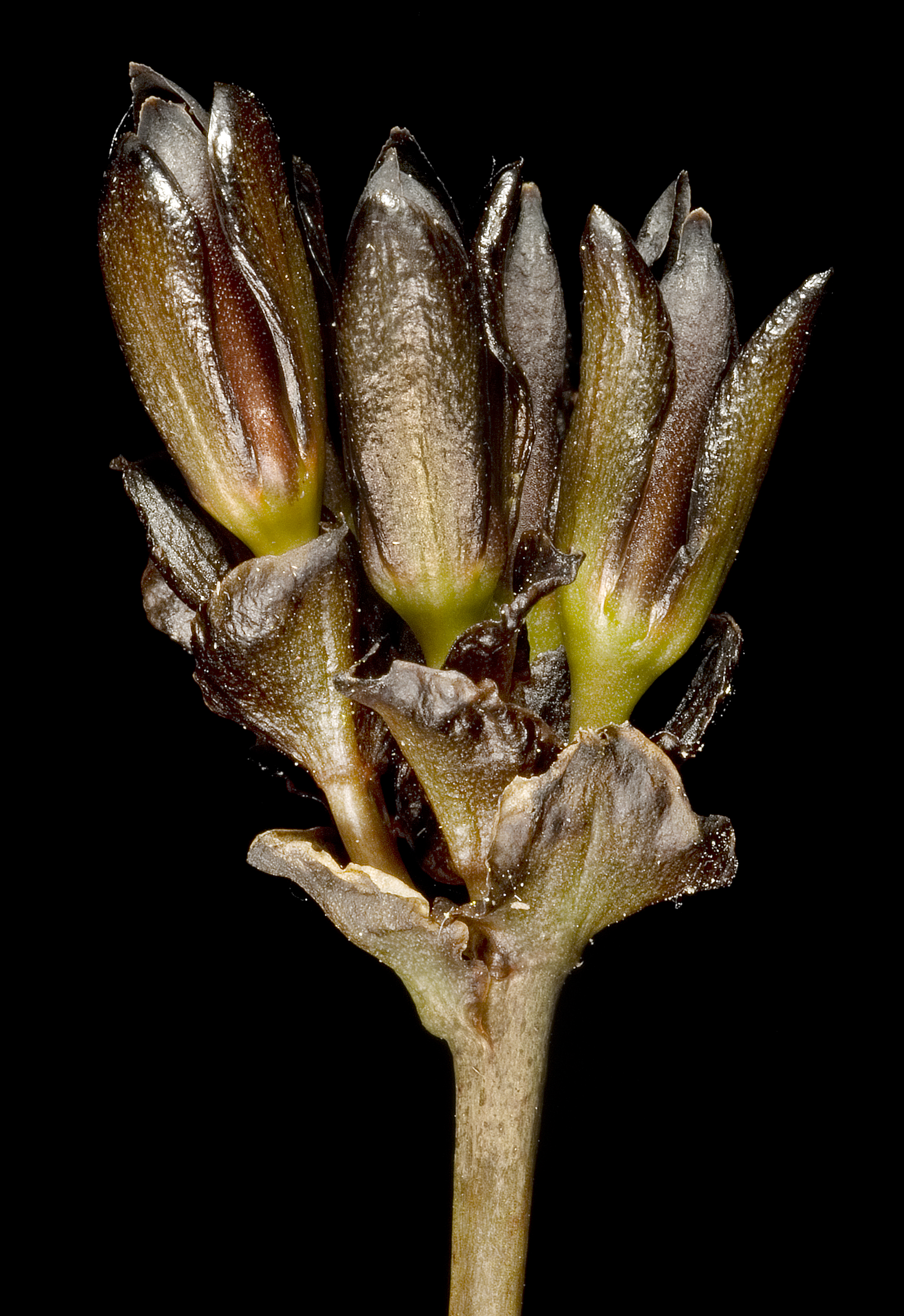

Scientific classification
- Kingdom: Plantae
- Clade: Tracheophytes
- Clade: Angiosperms
- Clade: Monocots
- Clade: Commelinids
- Order: Commelinales
- Family: Haemodoraceae
- Genus: Haemodorum
- Species: H. simplex

Binomial name
- Haemodorum simplex Lindl.
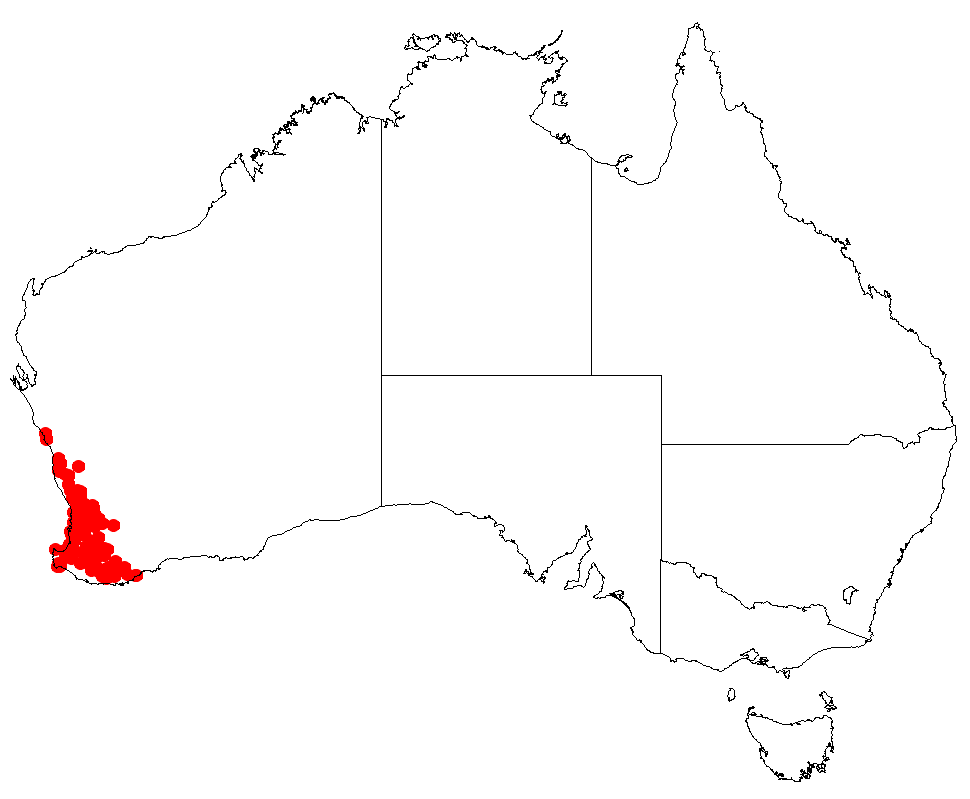
- Occurrence data from the Australasian Virtual Herbarium

= Haemodorum simplex =

Species of flowering plant

Haemodorum simplex is a plant in the Haemodoraceae (blood root) family, native to the south west of Western Australia, and was first described by John Lindley in 1840.

It is a perennial herb, growing from 0.2-0.65 m high, on clayey and sandy loams, and sands, at swampy sites.
