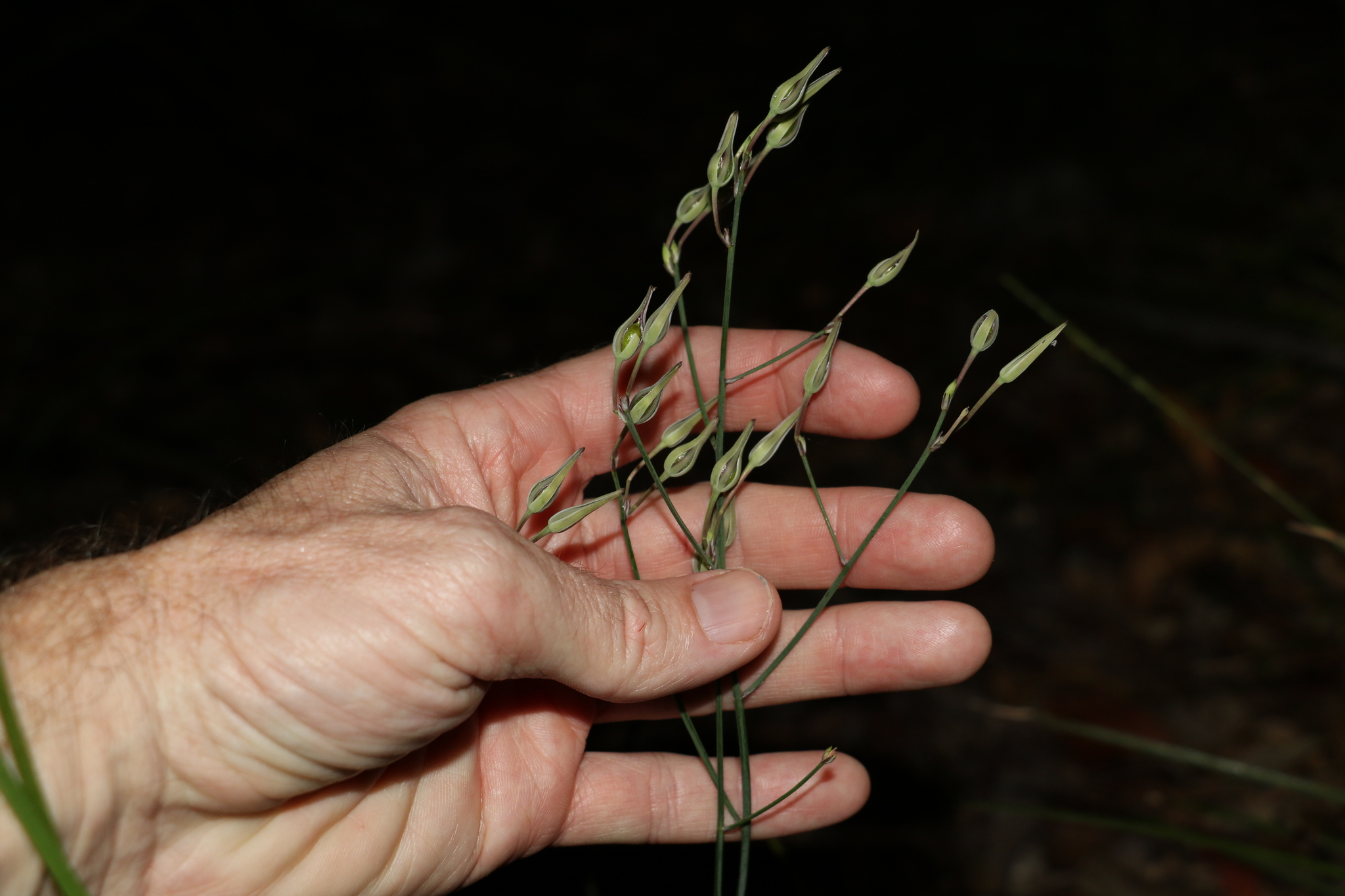

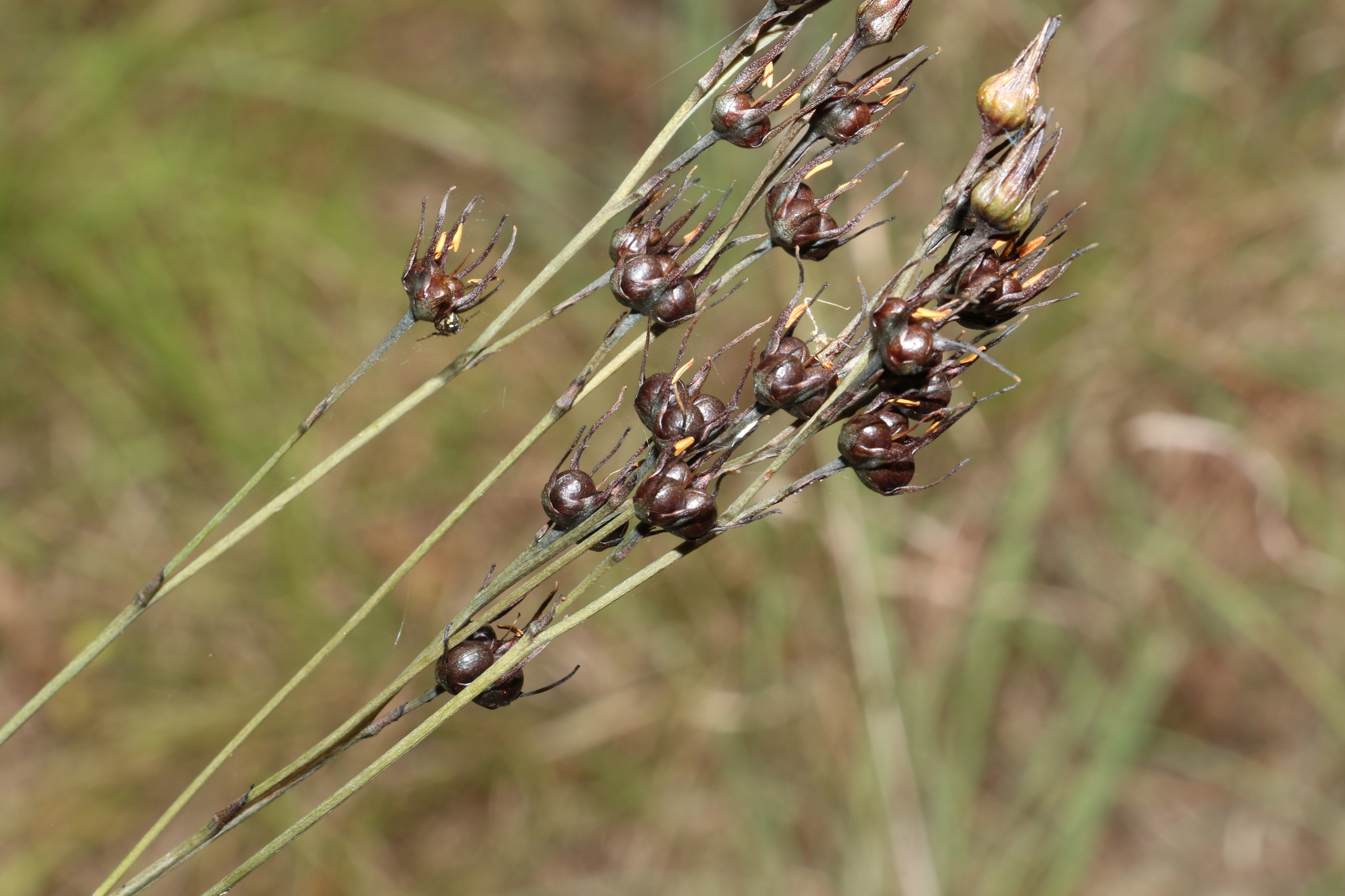

Scientific classification
- Kingdom: Plantae
- Clade: Tracheophytes
- Clade: Angiosperms
- Clade: Monocots
- Clade: Commelinids
- Order: Commelinales
- Family: Haemodoraceae
- Genus: Haemodorum
- Species: H. austroqueenslandicum

Binomial name
- Haemodorum austroqueenslandicum Domin
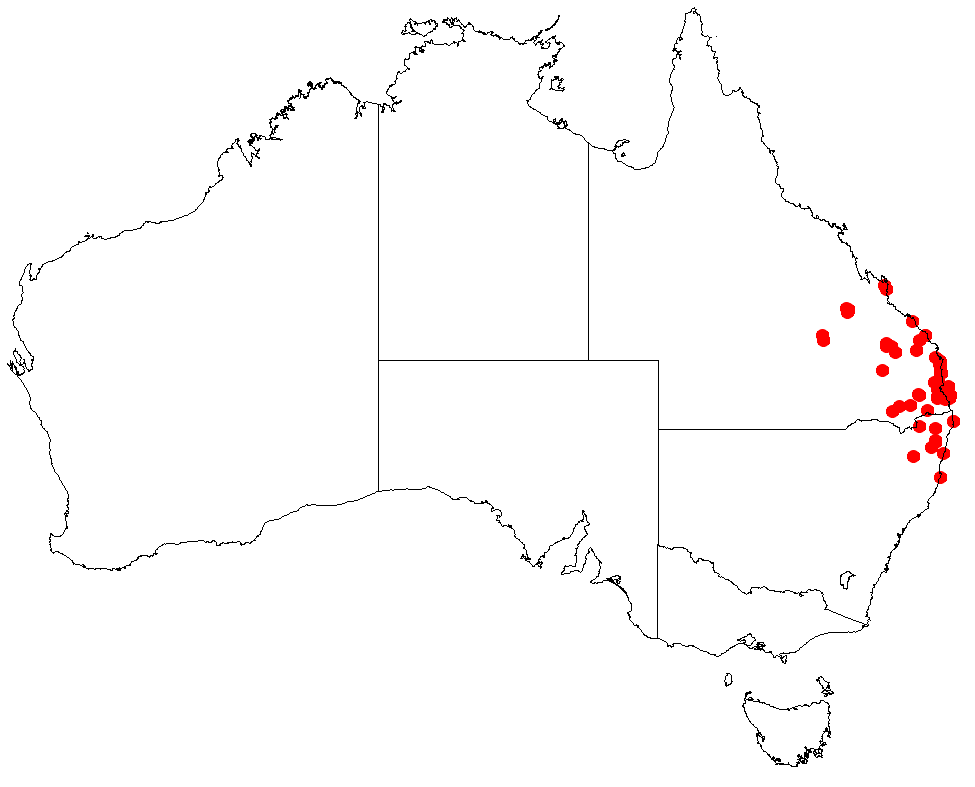

= Haemodorum austroqueenslandicum =

Species of flowering plant

Haemodorum austroqueenslandicum is a shrub native to Southeastern Australia.
