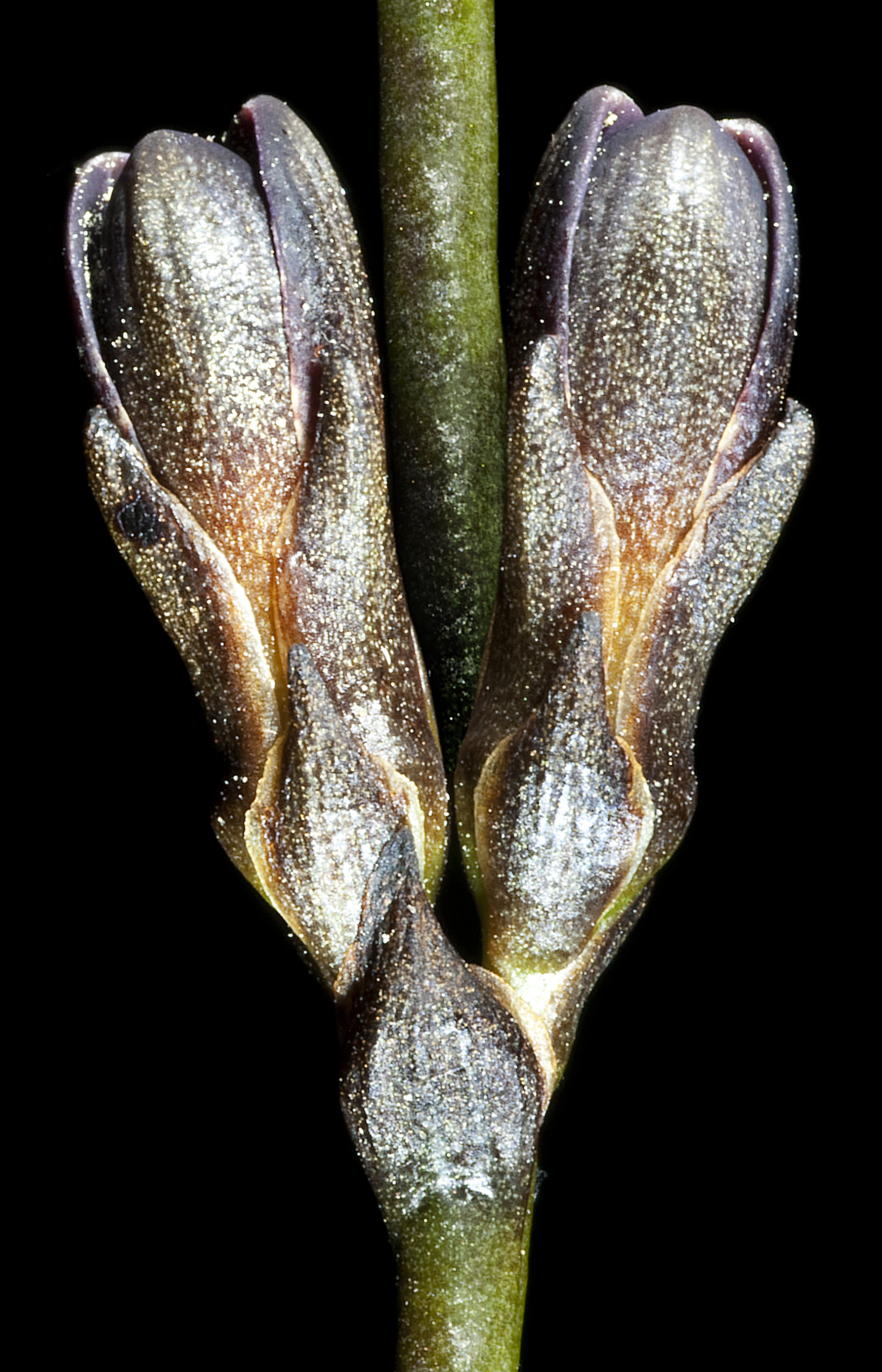
- H. brevisepalum (photo K.R.Thiele)

Scientific classification
- Kingdom: Plantae
- Clade: Tracheophytes
- Clade: Angiosperms
- Clade: Monocots
- Clade: Commelinids
- Order: Commelinales
- Family: Haemodoraceae
- Genus: Haemodorum
- Species: H. brevisepalum

Binomial name
- Haemodorum brevisepalum Benth.
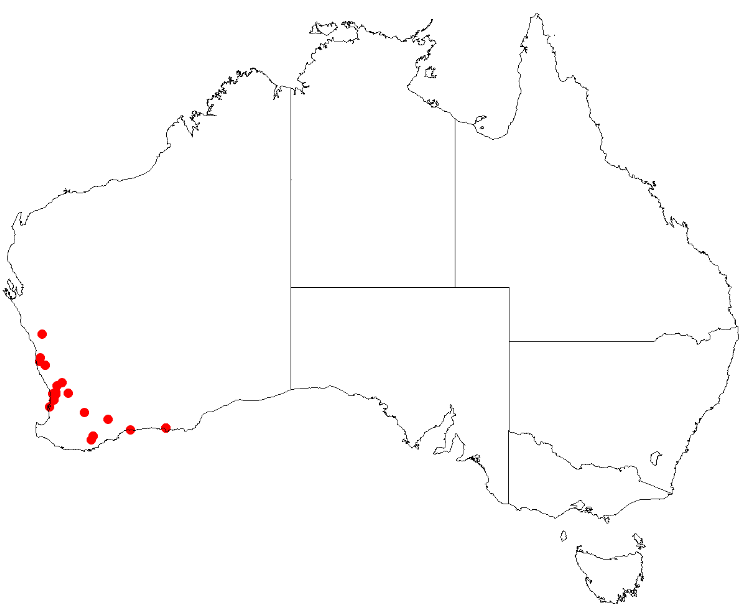
- Occurrence data from AVH

= Haemodorum brevisepalum =

Species of flowering plant

Haemodorum brevisepalum is a shrub in the Haemodoraceae family, native to southwestern Western Australia.

It was first described in 1873 by George Bentham.
