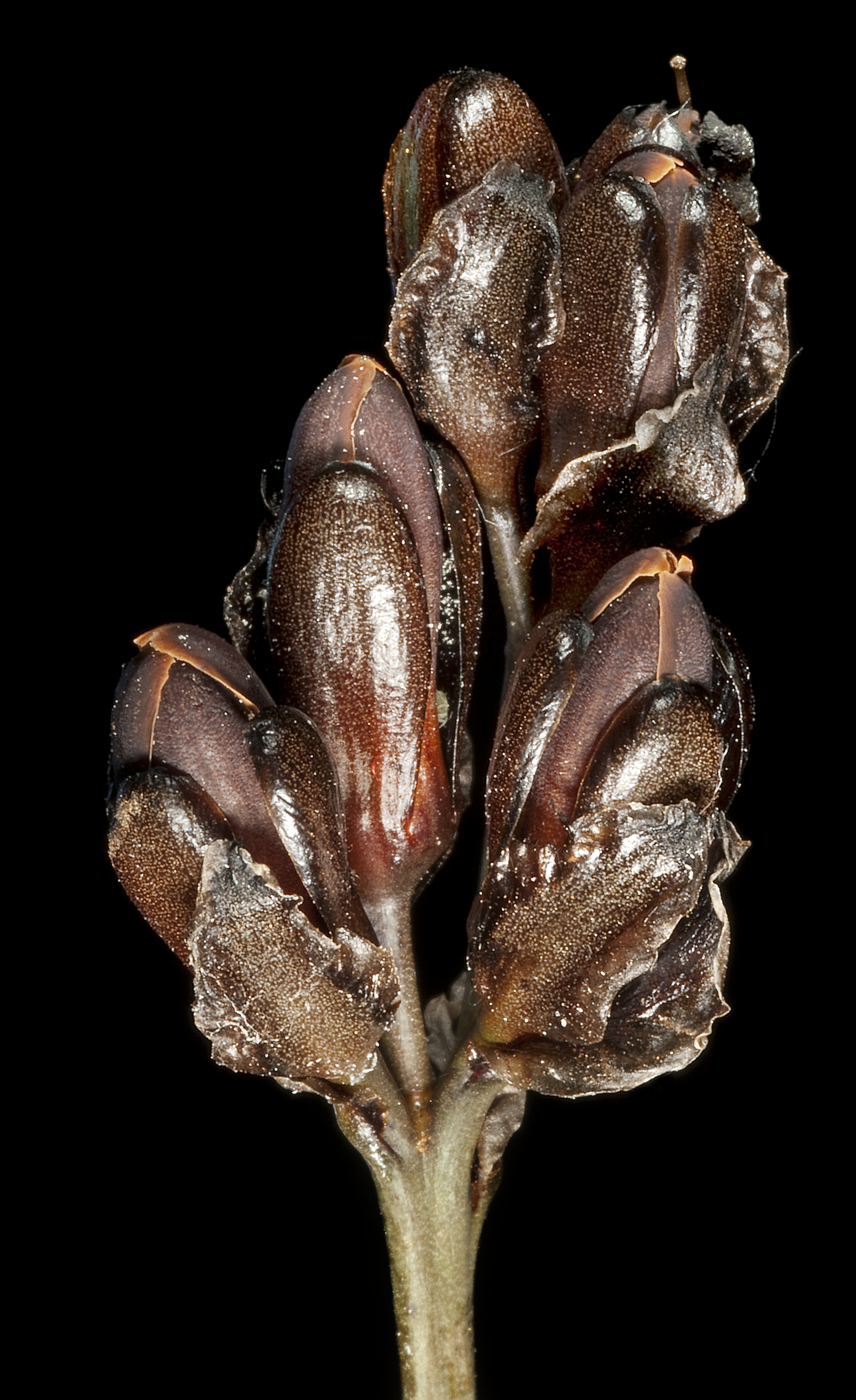
- H. discolor (photo K.R.Thiele)

Scientific classification
- Kingdom: Plantae
- Clade: Tracheophytes
- Clade: Angiosperms
- Clade: Monocots
- Clade: Commelinids
- Order: Commelinales
- Family: Haemodoraceae
- Genus: Haemodorum
- Species: H. discolor

Binomial name
- Haemodorum discolor T.D.Macfarl.
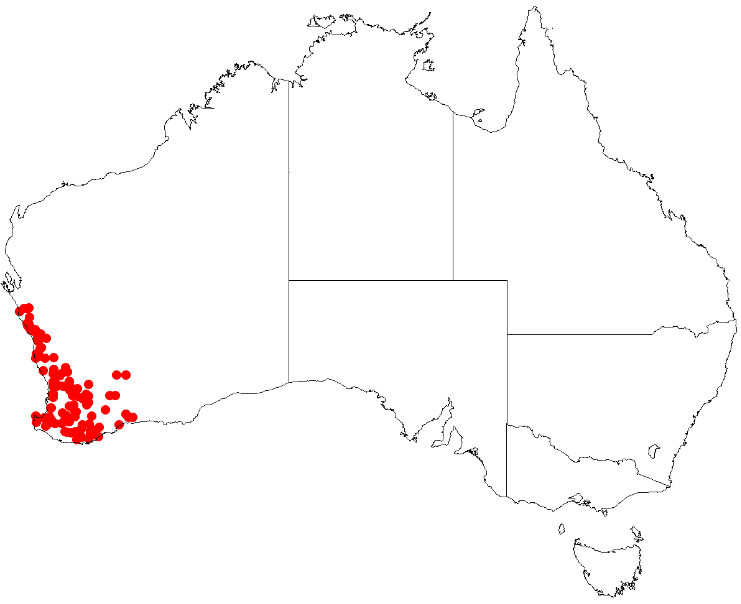
- Occurrence data from AVH

= Haemodorum discolor =

Species of flowering plant

Haemodorum discolor is a shrub native to southwestern Australia.
