= Haemodorum tenuifolium =

Scientific classification
- Kingdom: Plantae
- Clade: Tracheophytes
- Clade: Angiosperms
- Clade: Monocots
- Clade: Commelinids
- Order: Commelinales
- Family: Haemodoraceae
- Genus: Haemodorum
- Species: H. tenuifolium

Binomial name
- Haemodorum tenuifolium A.Cunn. ex Benth.
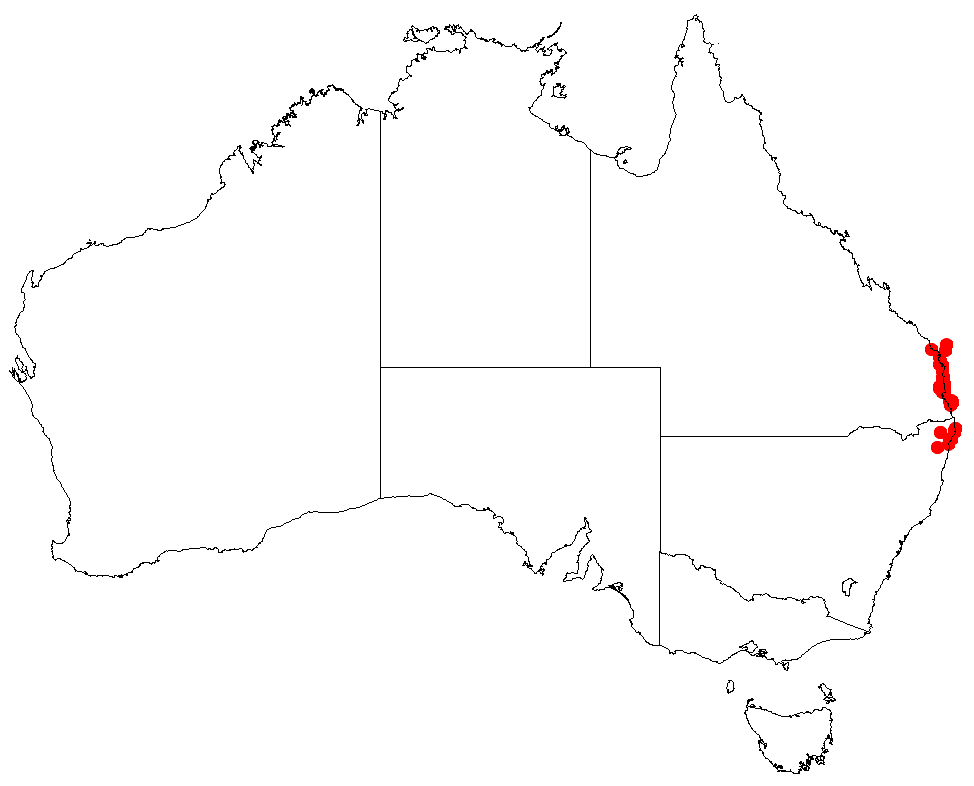

Species of flowering plant

Haemodorum tenuifolium is a plant native to southeastern Australia.
