= Haemodorum collevatum =

Scientific classification
- Kingdom: Plantae
- Clade: Tracheophytes
- Clade: Angiosperms
- Clade: Monocots
- Clade: Commelinids
- Order: Commelinales
- Family: Haemodoraceae
- Genus: Haemodorum
- Species: H. collevatum

Binomial name
- Haemodorum collevatum T.D Macfarl. & R.L Barrett

Species of plant

Haemodorum collevatum, commonly called the clothesline bloodroot, is named after the iconic Australian Hills Hoist clothesline because the way it produces flowers on long horizontal branches to the plant.

The plant was originally identified as being H. planifolium but, after reviewing collected specimens for this species, the collection was identified as containing four unique species. These new species allied to H. planifolium are Haemodorum brevistylum T.Macfarlane & R.L.Barrett, Haemodorum celsum R.L.Barrett & T.Macfarlane and this Haemodorum collevatum T.Macfarlane & R.L.Barrett.

== Description ==
They grow from a bulb approximately 60–200mm below the ground with a single stem rising up to 1350mm above the ground. These form panicles at near right angles to the stem. The 4–6 branches grow up to 450mm from the stem and they can have additional branches from them. Flowers that form at the terminals of these branches are about 1–14mm long with the sepals being marginally smaller. Colour of the flower is yellow red tips graduating to green on the lower part. They flower in November to December and produce fruit in December to January.

The species name is derived by combining the Latin word for hill collis and the word for lifting up as in hoist levatum. This is because the way the plant flowers resembles a Hills Hoist.
