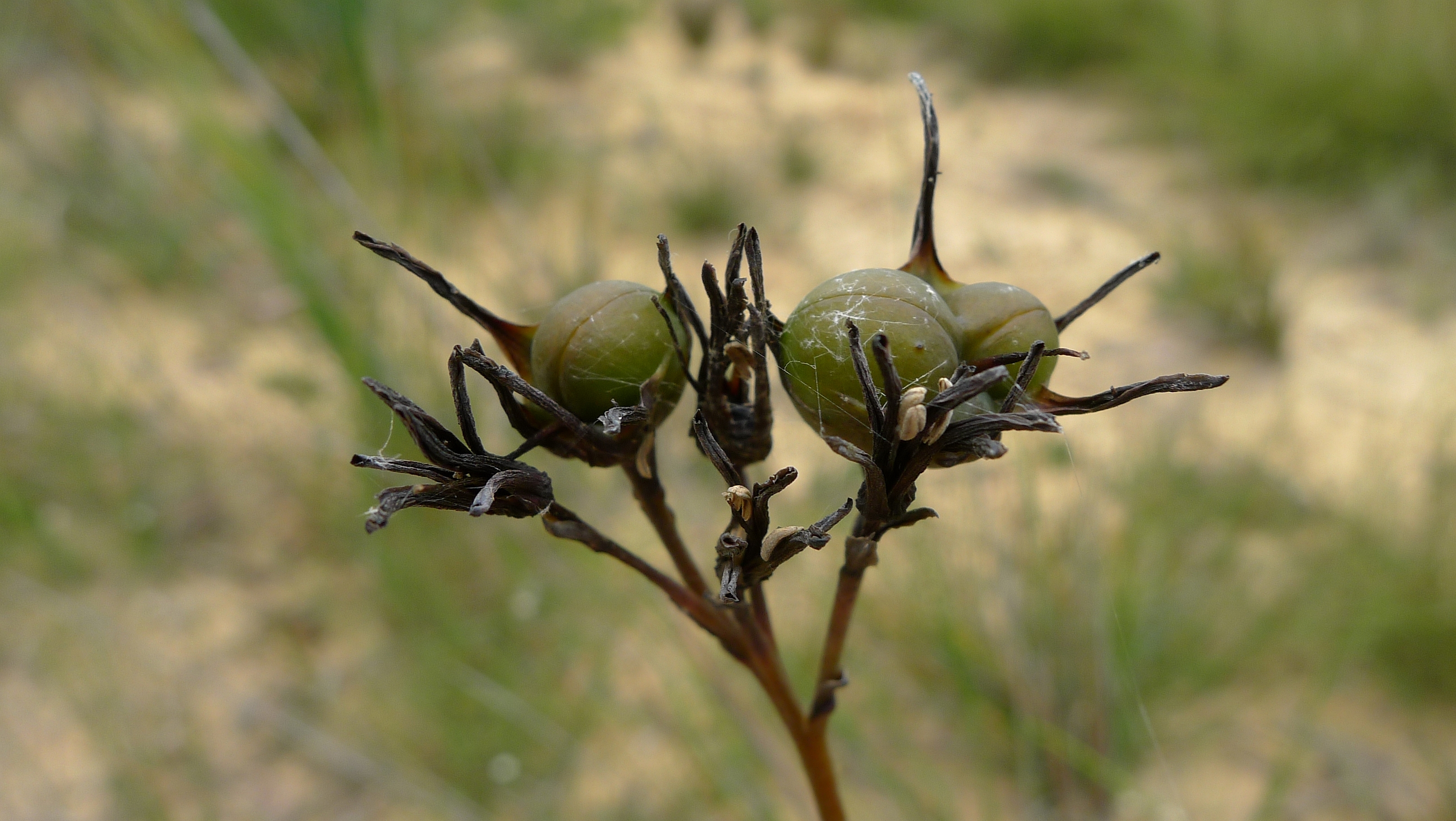

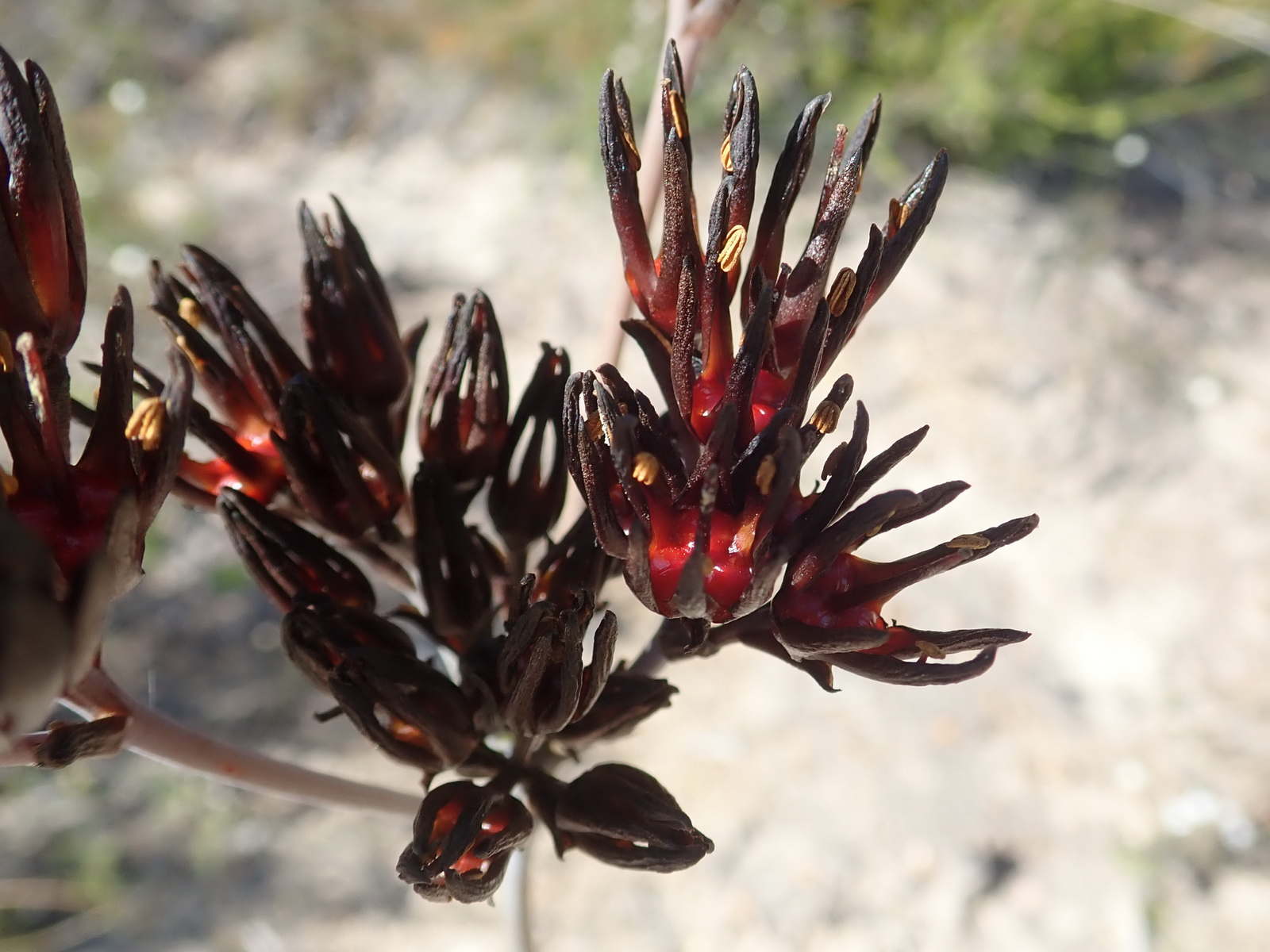

Scientific classification
- Kingdom: Plantae
- Clade: Tracheophytes
- Clade: Angiosperms
- Clade: Monocots
- Clade: Commelinids
- Order: Commelinales
- Family: Haemodoraceae
- Genus: Haemodorum
- Species: H. corymbosum

Binomial name
- Haemodorum corymbosum Vahl
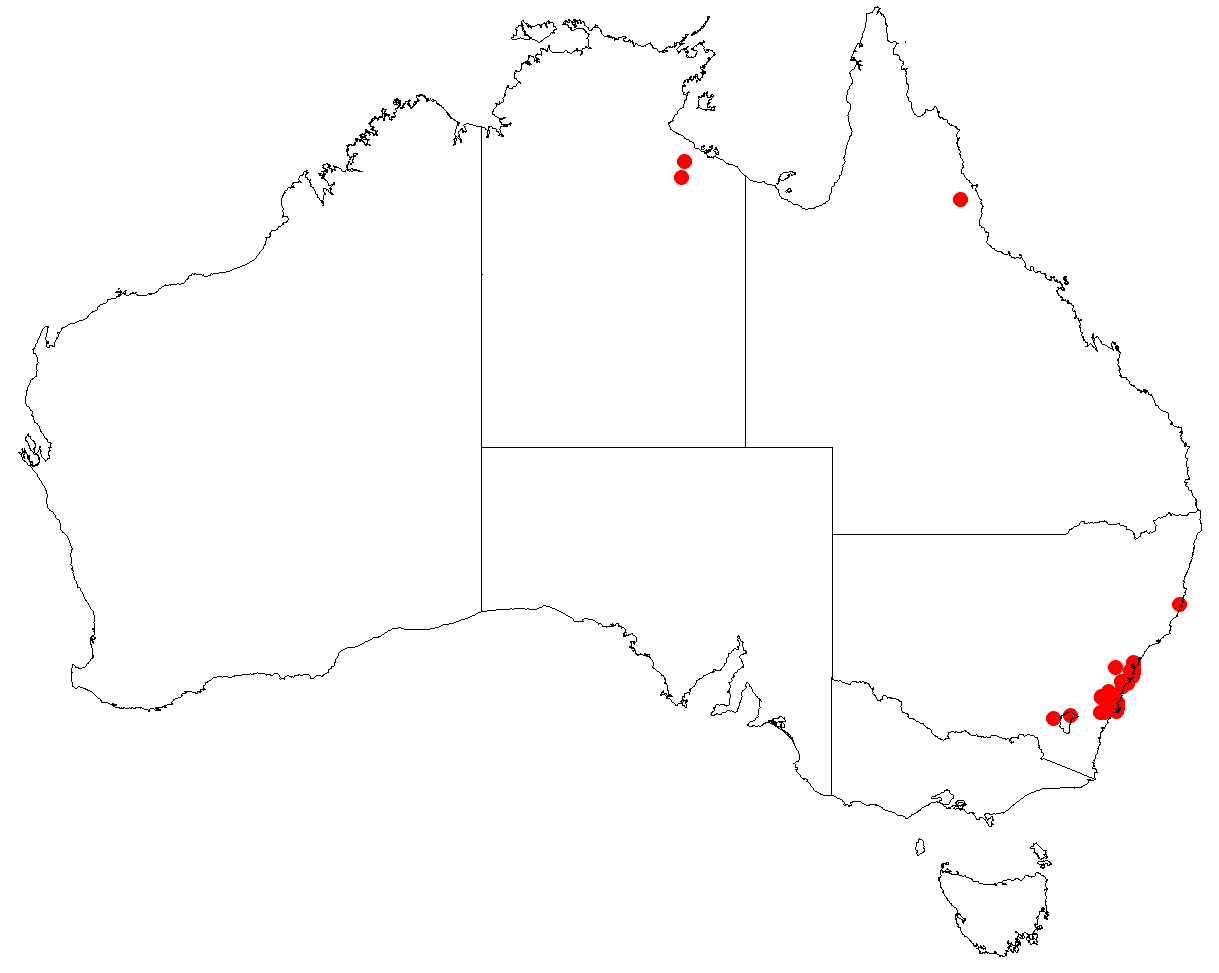
- Collection records of H. corymbosum from AVH

= Haemodorum corymbosum =

Species of flowering plant

Haemodorum corymbosum, commonly known as the rush-leaf bloodroot, is a shrub native to southeastern Australia. Danish-Norwegian naturalist Martin Vahl described this species in his 1805 work Enumeratio Plantarum.

It grows as a strappy herbaceous shrub 40–70 cm high, with three to four 40–75 cm long leaves arising from the base. These are narrow to terete and 1–1.5 mm in diameter. Its roots contain a bright red pigment. Flowering occurs over the warmer months (October to January) and is profuse only after bushfire. The brown-black flowers are 12–15 mm long and arranged in a corymb.

Found in coastal areas from the Budawang Ranges to the vicinity of Gosford, with one inland population at Agnes Banks, Haemodorum corymbosum grows on sandy soils—occurring in swamps as well as sandstone ridges. It occurs with such woodland plants as Sydney red gum (Angophora costata), Sydney peppermint (Eucalyptus piperita), scribbly gum (E. sclerophylla), saw banksia (Banksia serrata, and heathland plants such as dwarf apple (Angophora hispida), scrub she-oak (Allocasuarina distyla).
