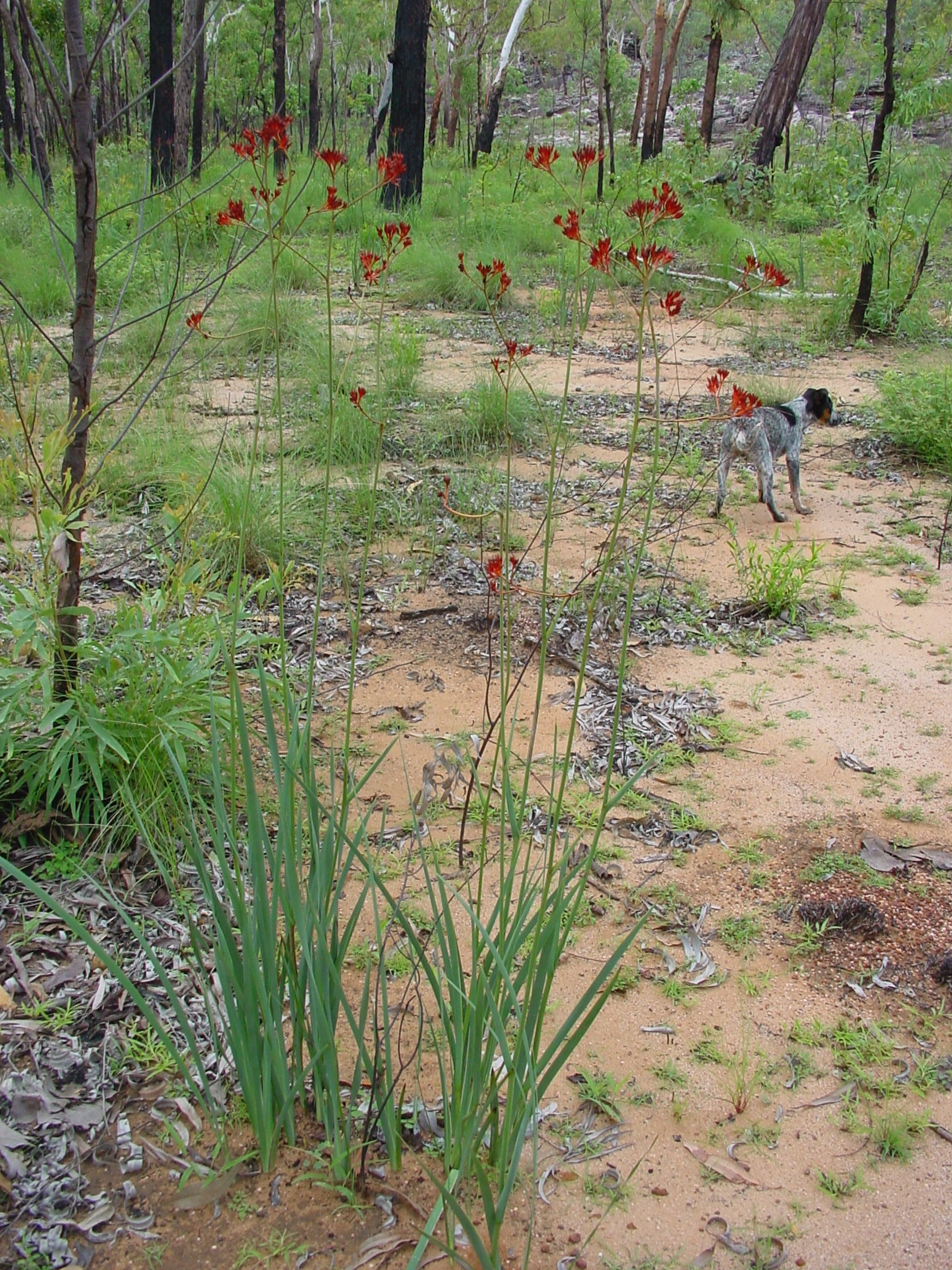

Scientific classification
- Kingdom: Plantae
- Clade: Tracheophytes
- Clade: Angiosperms
- Clade: Monocots
- Clade: Commelinids
- Order: Commelinales
- Family: Haemodoraceae
- Genus: Haemodorum
- Species: H. coccineum

Binomial name
- Haemodorum coccineum R.Br.
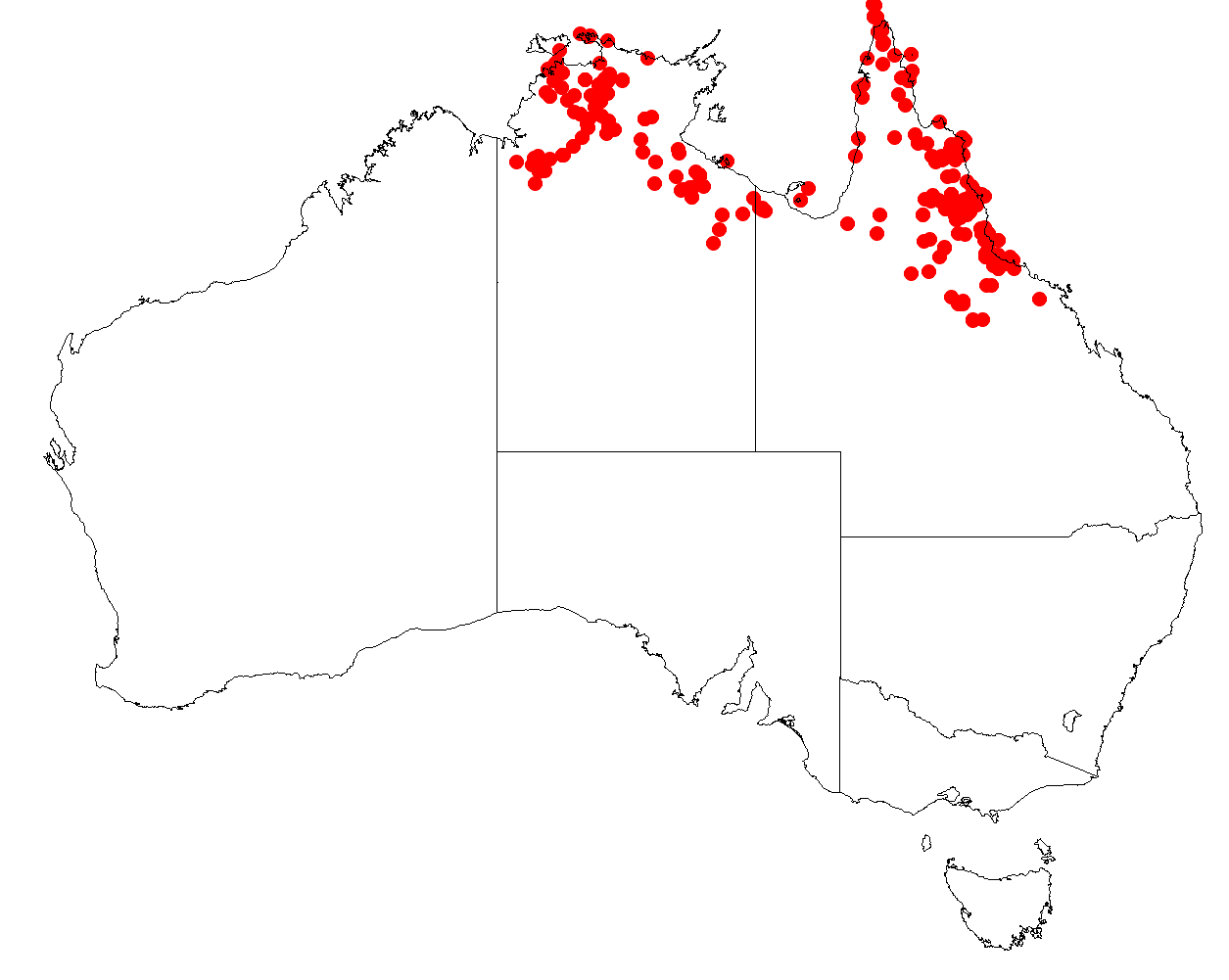
- H. coccineum collection data from Australasian Virtual Herbarium

= Haemodorum coccineum =

Species of flowering plant

Haemodorum coccineum (bunyagutjagutja, bloodroot, menang, scarlet bloodroot, red root) is a flowering plant in the same family as kangaroo paw.

== Description ==
A perennial herb to one meter high. Although it is not grass, it has a grass-like appearance, with strap-like, narrow, leathery leaves arising from the base of the plant.

Flowering usually occurs between November and March, during the Top End wet season, however flowers have been observed as early as October and as late as May. The flowers are deep-red or orange red and occur in dense clusters on long stiff stalks, which also arise from the base of the plant.

Fruit develop between November and March, and can linger until May. The fruit are red to black, fleshy capsules with three lobes. The mature fruit release a red-purple juice when crushed.

== Distribution and habitat ==
Found in the Top End of the Northern Territory, Northern Queensland and Papua New Guinea. Occurs in open woodland habitats on gravelly or shallow lateritic soils and sandstone.

== Uses ==
=== Dyes ===
Indigenous Australians use this plant to make red, brown and purple dyes for coloring plant fibres.

The bulbous red root is chopped or crushed and boiled in water to release the red-brown dyes, while the purple shades are made from H. coccineum fruit.

Fibres such as the stripped leaves of Pandanus spiralis or the new leaves of Livistona humilis are added to the dye-bath, and later the colored fibre is used to make items such as baskets (Pandanus), string bags (Livistona) and fibre sculptures.

=== Other uses ===
Suitable as a bedding or edging plant in native gardens.

The fruits can be used in floral arrangements.

Some sources report Indigenous Australians used the plant to treat snake-bite, and the dry stalks were used as fire-sticks.

== Propagation and cultivation ==
Haemodorum coccineum can be propagated from seed. Vegetative propagation can be achieved by dividing the bulbous root.

Plants prefer a well-drained sandy or gravelly soil and full sun. In the dry season the plant will usually die back, leaving the underground rootstock to regenerate later in the year.
