= Haemodorum ensifolium =

Scientific classification
- Kingdom: Plantae
- Clade: Tracheophytes
- Clade: Angiosperms
- Clade: Monocots
- Clade: Commelinids
- Order: Commelinales
- Family: Haemodoraceae
- Genus: Haemodorum
- Species: H. ensifolium

Binomial name
- Haemodorum ensifolium F.Muell.
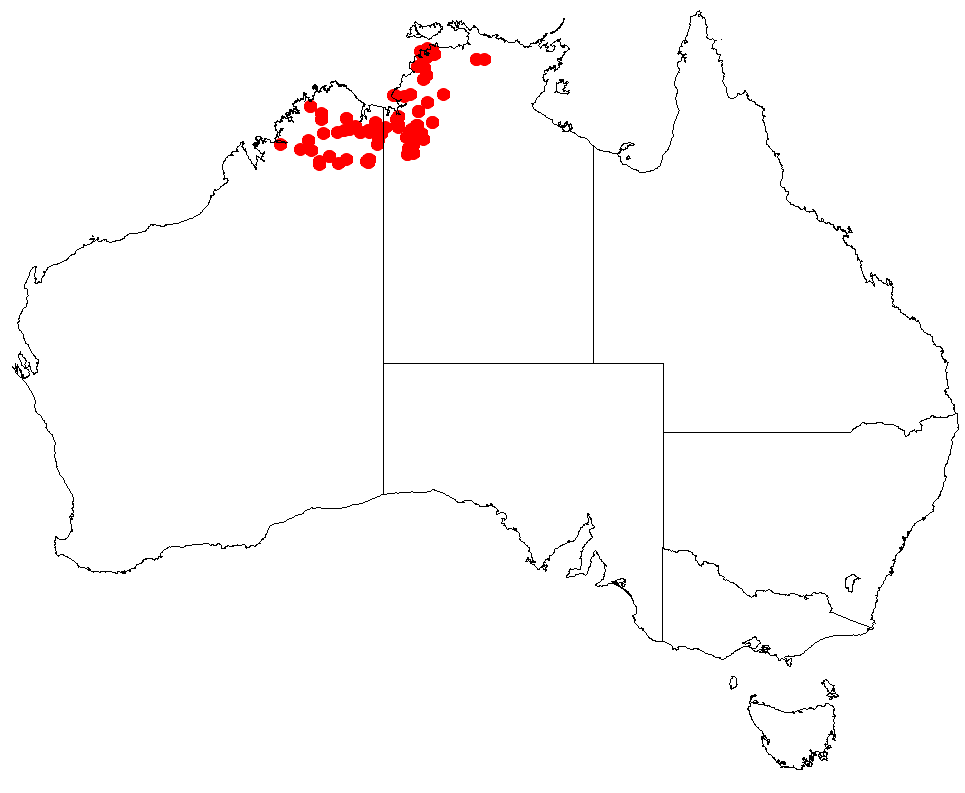

Species of flowering plant

Haemodorum ensifolium is a shrub native to northwestern Australia.
