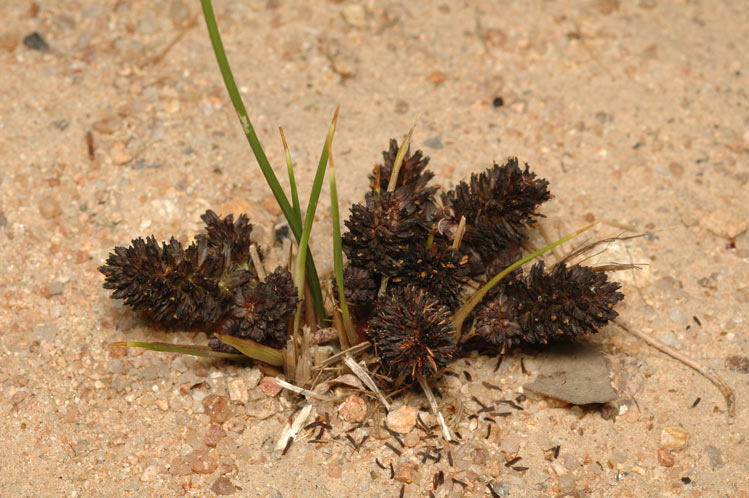

Scientific classification
- Kingdom: Plantae
- Clade: Tracheophytes
- Clade: Angiosperms
- Clade: Monocots
- Clade: Commelinids
- Order: Commelinales
- Family: Haemodoraceae
- Genus: Haemodorum
- Species: H. brevicaule

Binomial name
- Haemodorum brevicaule F.Muell.
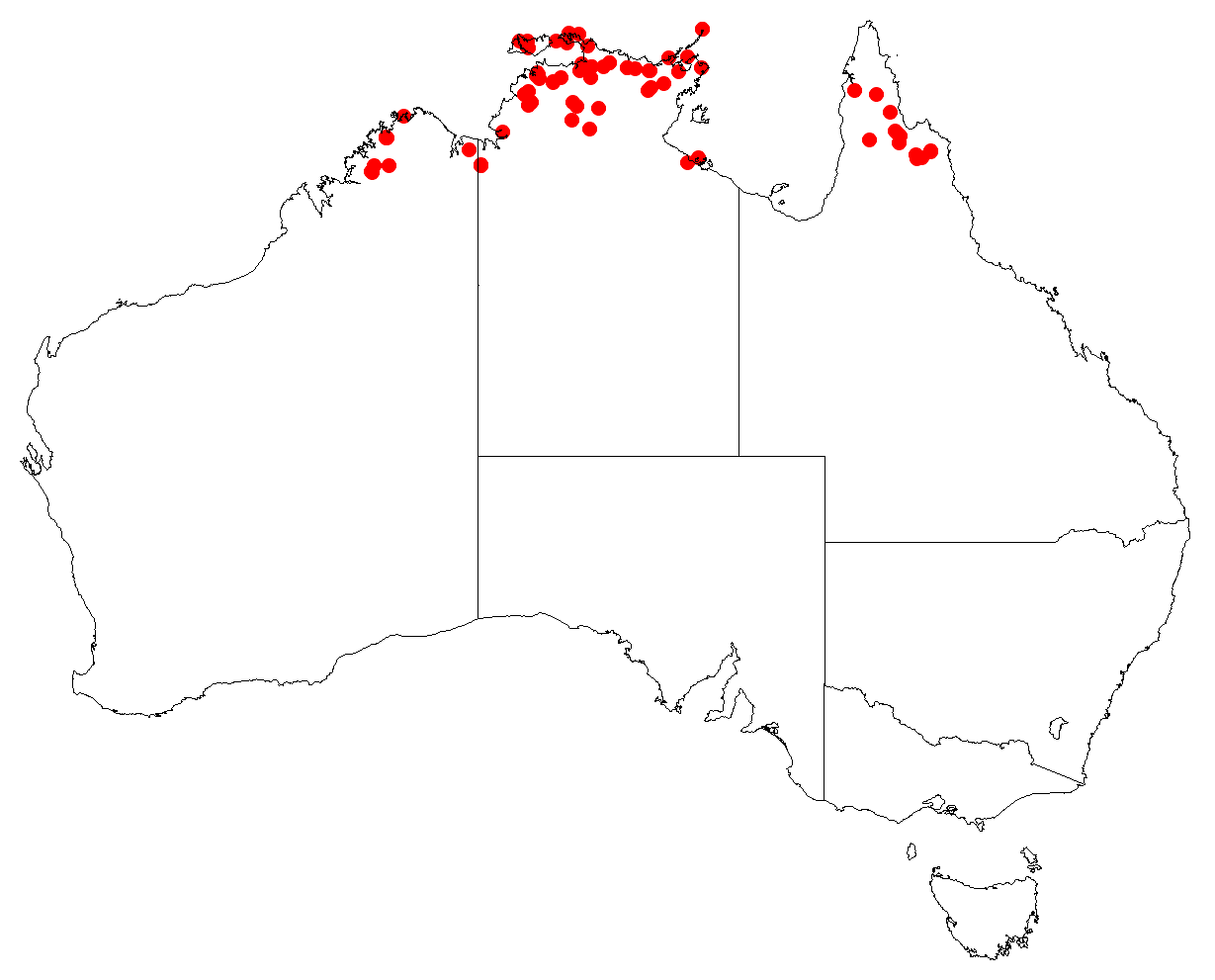
- H. brevicaule Collection data from Australasian Virtual Herbarium

= Haemodorum brevicaule =

Species of flowering plant

Haemodorum brevicaule is a perennial herb from 0.025 to 0.3 m tall, in the bloodroot family, the Haemodoraceae, native to northern Australia. It has deep-red to purplish-black flowers which are seen from September to December, and it grows on red clay and basalt.

== Etymology ==
The name, Haemodorum, was chosen by Smith in 1798 for the blood-red root, haem- being Greek for blood-red. Mueller in 1858, gave this species the specific epithet, brevicaule, which derives from the Latin brevi- (short), and caulis (stem), giving the meaning 'short-stemmed'.

== Description ==
It has flat, hairless, leaves about 9 to 31 cm long and 0.5 to 2 mm wide, and a smooth scape about 9 cm to 13 cm long. The perianth is formed of two rings of three tepals which are uniformly red, red-brown, purple or black. It has three stamens all at the same level with the filaments being 1 to 1.2 mm long and having slightly longer anthers. The plant flowers from September to December.

== Distribution ==
It is found in Western Australia, the Northern Territory and Queensland in the IBRA regions of the Northern Kimberley, Victoria Bonaparte, Arnhem Coast, Darwin Coastal, Northern Kimberley, Pine Creek, Central Arnhem, Tiwi Cobourg, Arnhem Plateau, Gulf Coastal, Daly Basin, the Cape York Peninsula region in open eucalypt forest in dry sandy soils, and also in places that are seasonally flooded.

== Taxonomy ==
H. brevicaule was first described by Ferdinand von Mueller in 1858. This description was slightly modified in 1987 by Macfarlane. The syntype is held in the National Herbarium of Victoria and was collected by Mueller in 1855 towards the Macadam range in the Victoria-Daly region of the Northern Territory.
