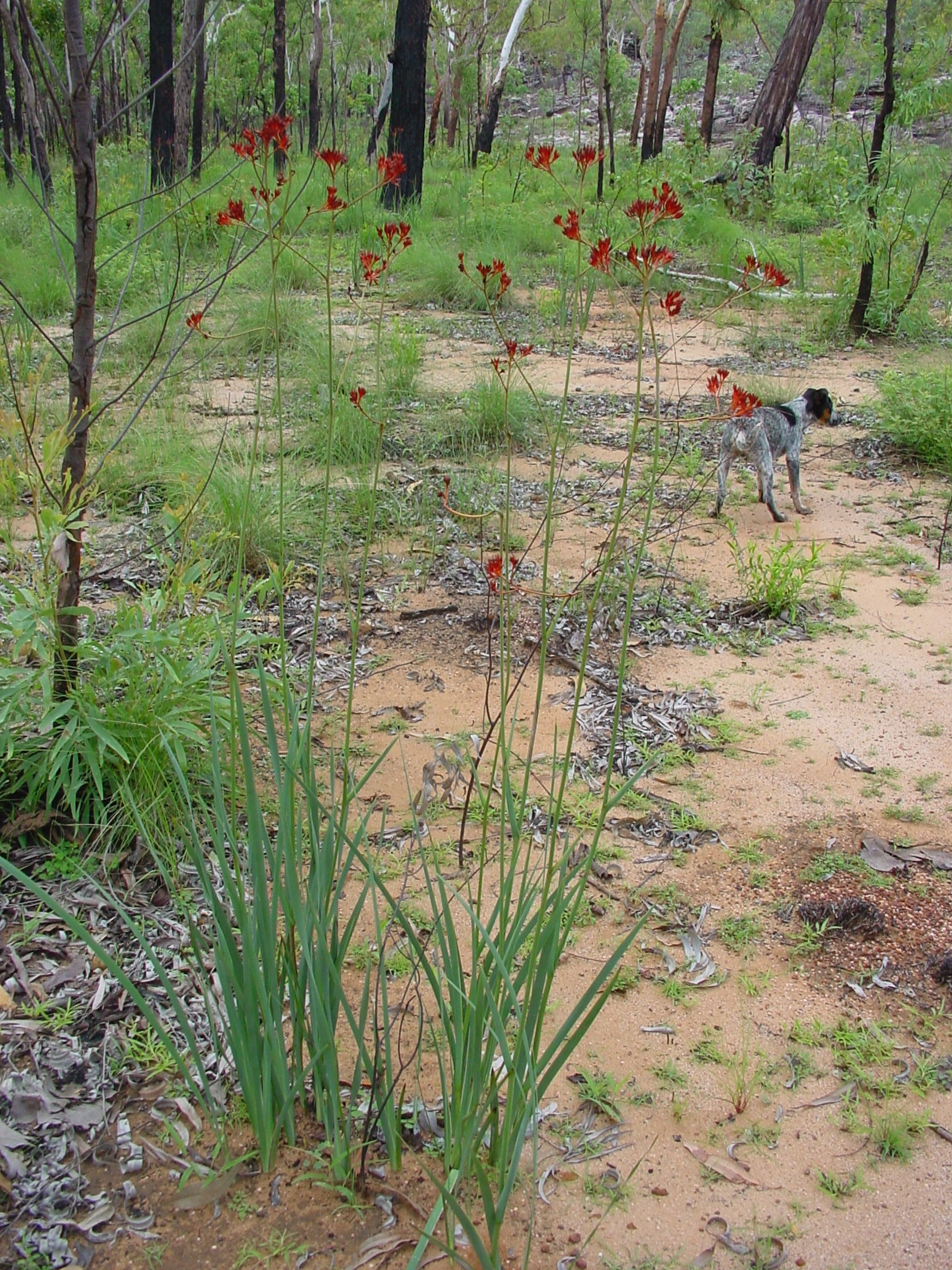
- Haemodorum coccineum

Scientific classification
- Kingdom: Plantae
- Clade: Tracheophytes
- Clade: Angiosperms
- Clade: Monocots
- Clade: Commelinids
- Order: Commelinales
- Family: Haemodoraceae
- Subfamily: Haemodoroideae
- Genus: Haemodorum; Sm.

Type species
- Haemodorum corymbosum Vahl
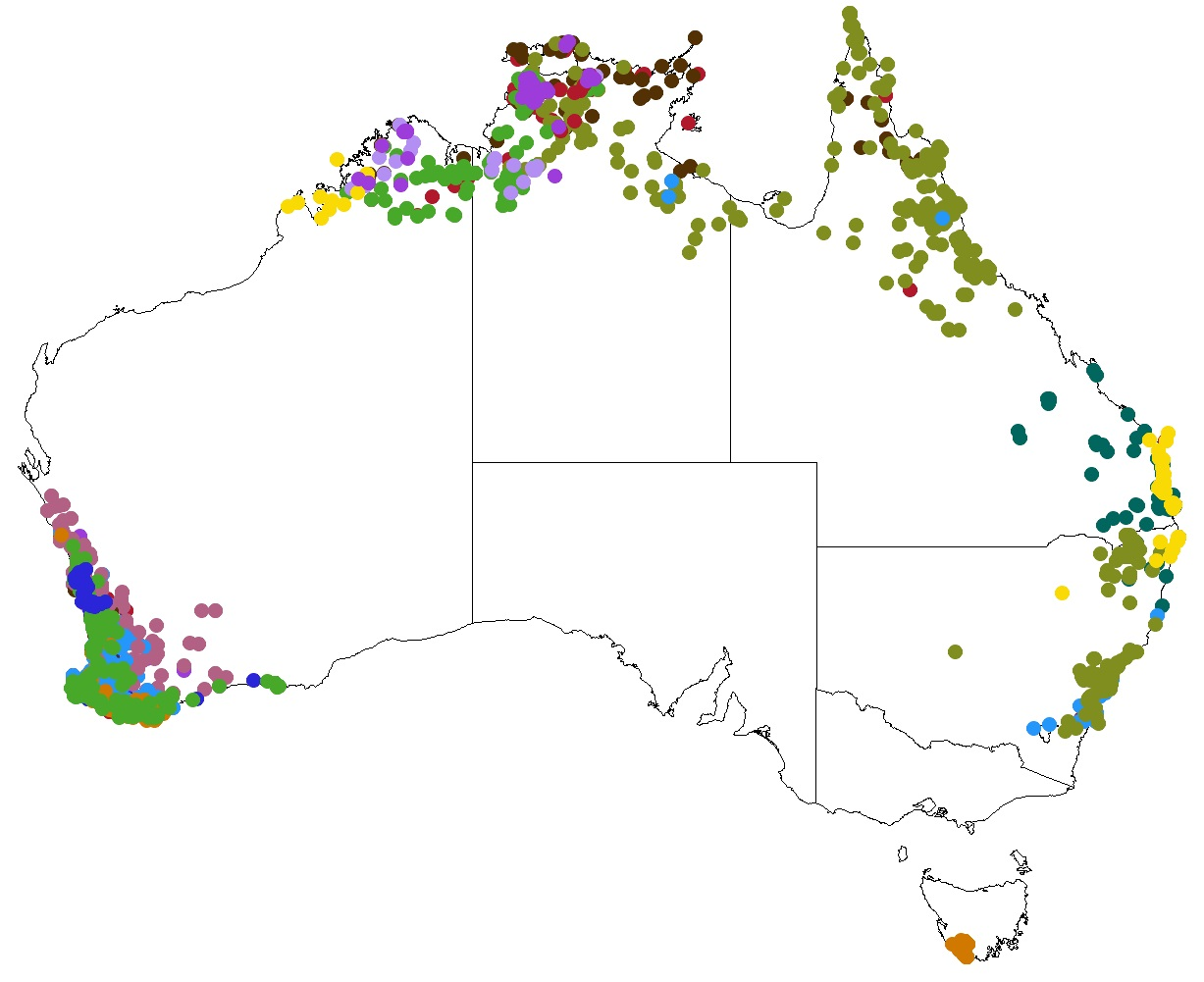
- Collection data for Haemodorum spp. within Australia

= Haemodorum =

Genus of flowering plants

Haemodorum is a genus of herbs in the family Haemodoraceae, first described as a genus in 1798 by James Edward Smith. The genus is native to New Guinea and Australia. The type species is Haemodorum corymbosum Vahl, first described by Martin Vahl in 1805.

species

- Haemodorum austroqueenslandicum Domin - SE Queensland, NE New South Wales
- Haemodorum basalticum R.L.Barrett, Hopper and T.D.Macfarl. - N Western Australia
- Haemodorum brevicaule F.Muell. - Queensland, Northern Territory, N Western Australia
- Haemodorum brevisepalum Benth. - SW Western Australia
- Haemodorum brevistylum R.L.Barrett and T.D.Macfarl. - New South Wales
- Haemodorum capitatum R.L.Barrett and Hopper - N Western Australia
- Haemodorum celsum R.L.Barrett and T.D.Macfarl. - SE Queensland, NE New South Wales
- Haemodorum clarksonii Hopper and E.J.Hickman - Northern Territory, Queensland
- Haemodorum coccineum R.Br. - New Guinea, Queensland, Northern Territory
- Haemodorum collevatum T.D.Macfarl. and R.L.Barrett - New South Wales
- Haemodorum condensatum R.L.Barrett and Hopper - N Western Australia
- Haemodorum corymbosum Vahl - New South Wales
- Haemodorum discolor T.D.Macfarl. - SW Western Australia
- Haemodorum distichophyllum Hook. - Tasmania
- Haemodorum ensifolium F.Muell. - NW Northern Territory, N Western Australia
- Haemodorum ghungalorum Hopper - Queensland
- Haemodorum gracile T.D.Macfarl. - N Western Australia
- Haemodorum griseofuscum R.L.Barrett, Hopper and M.D.Barrett - N Western Australia
- Haemodorum interrex M.D.Barrett and R.L.Barrett - N Western Australia
- Haemodorum laxum R.Br. - SW Western Australia
- Haemodorum loratum T.D.Macfarl. - SW Western Australia
- Haemodorum macfarlanei R.L.Barrett - N Western Australia
- Haemodorum paniculatum Lindl. - SW Western Australia
- Haemodorum parviflorum Benth. - N Northern Territory, N Western Australia
- Haemodorum planifolium R.Br. - SE Queensland, New South Wales
- Haemodorum sandifordiae Hopper and E.J.Hickman - SW Western Australia
- Haemodorum simplex Lindl. - SW Western Australia
- Haemodorum simulans F.Muell. - SW Western Australia
- Haemodorum sparsiflorum F.Muell. - SW Western Australia
- Haemodorum spicatum R.Br. - SW Western Australia
- Haemodorum tenuifolium A.Cunn. ex Benth. - SE Queensland, NE New South Wales
- Haemodorum thedae R.L.Barrett - N Western Australia
- Haemodorum venosum T.D.Macfarl. - SW Western Australia

formerly included

moved to Hagenbachia

- Haemodorum brasiliense - Hagenbachia brasiliensis - Brazil

== Phylogeny ==
Comparison of homologous DNA has increased the understanding of the phylogenetic relationships between the genera in the Haemodoroideae subfamily. The following tree represents those insights.

- subfamily Haemodoroideae
  - - - Haemodorum
      - Lachnanthes
    - Dilatris
  - - - Xiphidium
      - Schiekia
    - - Wachendorfia
      - Barberetta
