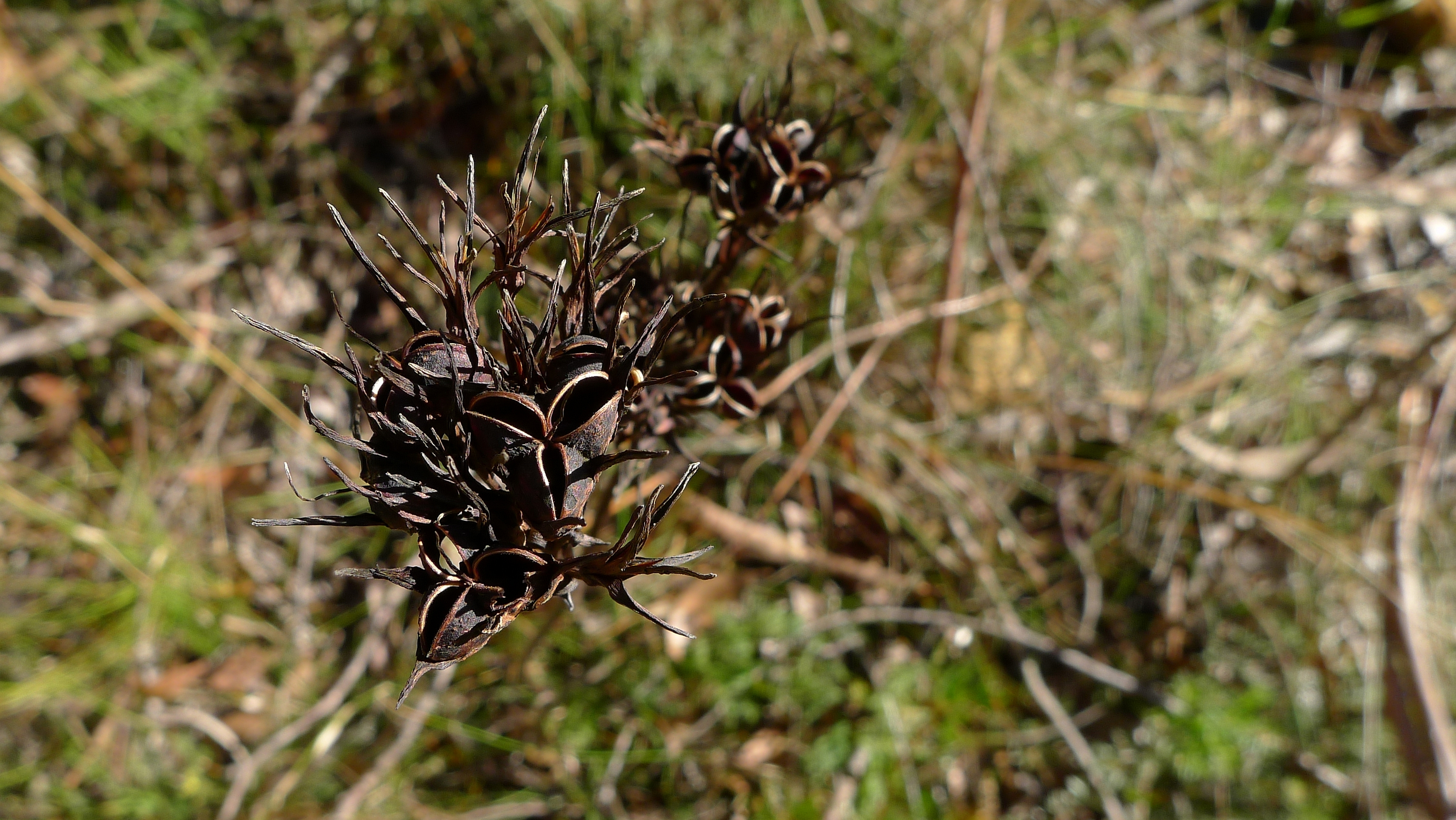

Scientific classification
- Kingdom: Plantae
- Clade: Embryophytes
- Clade: Tracheophytes
- Clade: Angiosperms
- Clade: Monocots
- Clade: Commelinids
- Order: Commelinales
- Family: Haemodoraceae
- Genus: Haemodorum
- Species: H. planifolium

Binomial name
- Haemodorum planifolium R.Br.
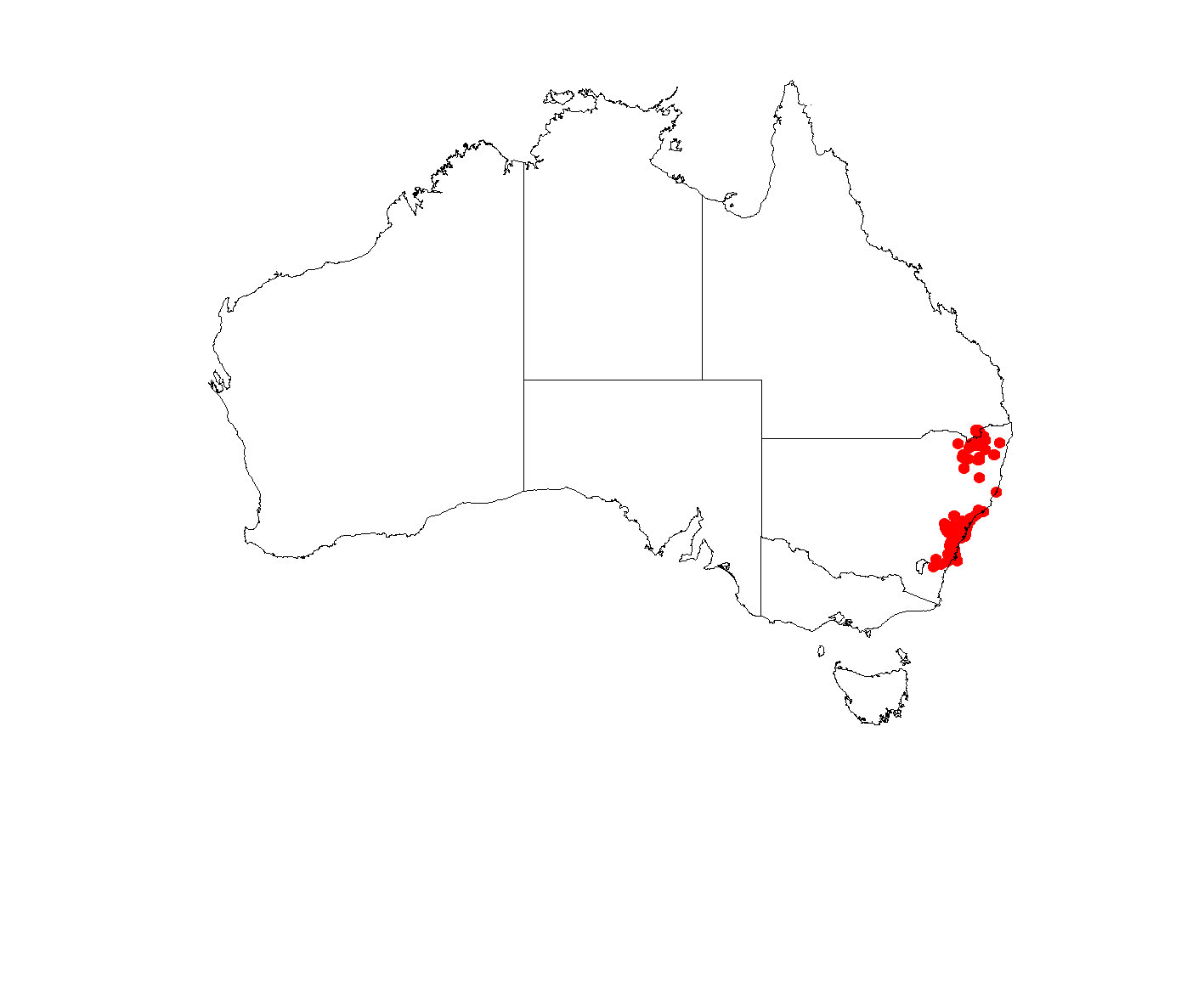

= Haemodorum planifolium =

Species of flowering plant

Haemodorum planifolium is a shrub native to southeastern Australia.

In 2025 a review of this species was published. Using available collections and institute observation they were identified H. planifoloium containing four unique species. These new species allied to H. planifolium are Haemodorum brevistylum T.Macfarlane & R.L.Barrett, Haemodorum celsum R.L.Barrett & T.Macfarlane and this Haemodorum collevatum T.Macfarlane & R.L.Barrett.
