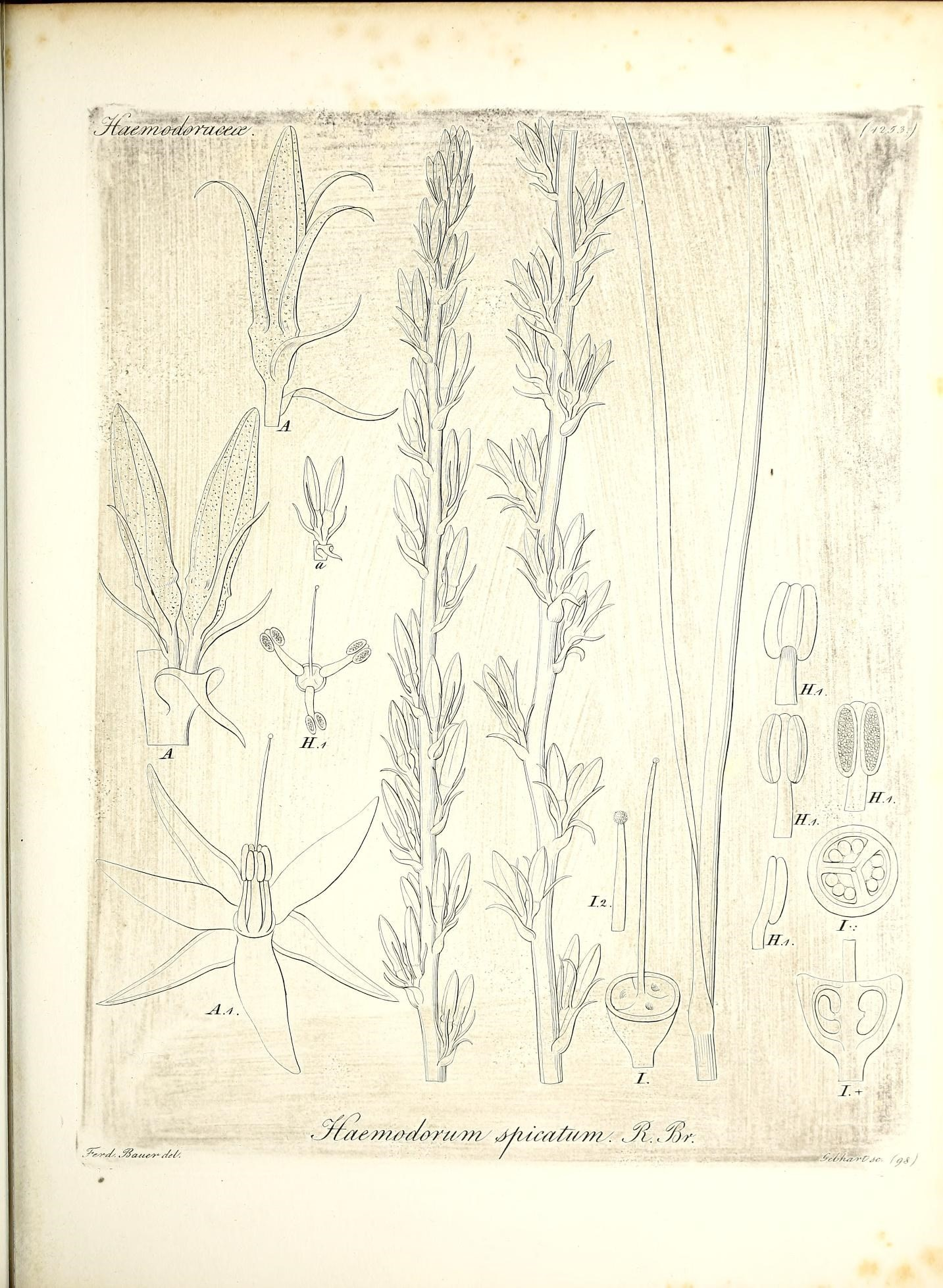
- Iconographia generum plantarum (Endlicher)

Scientific classification
- Kingdom: Plantae
- Clade: Tracheophytes
- Clade: Angiosperms
- Clade: Monocots
- Clade: Commelinids
- Order: Commelinales
- Family: Haemodoraceae
- Genus: Haemodorum
- Species: H. spicatum

Binomial name
- Haemodorum spicatum R.Br.
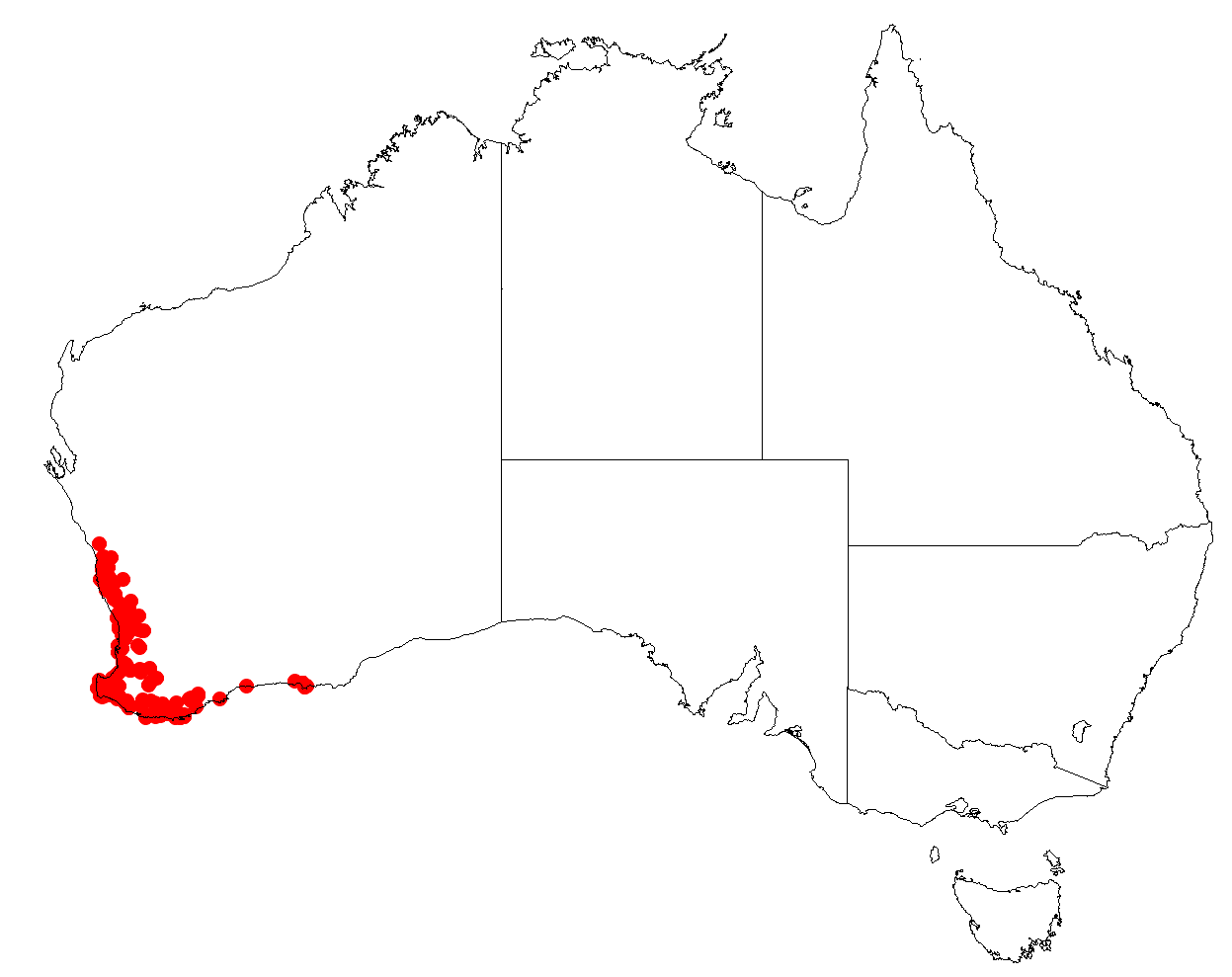
- Occurrence data from AVH

Synonyms
- Haemodorum edule Lehm. ex Endl.

= Haemodorum spicatum =

Species of flowering plant

Haemodorum spicatum is a plant in the Haemodoraceae family native to south Western Australia.

== Description ==
The leaves are terete or elliptical and 12–59 cm long and 1–5 mm wide. There are no bristles or hairs on the leaf margin, nor on the surface of the leaf, which is smooth. The flower scape is smooth and 65–77.5 cm long. The inflorescence is subtended by a bract 25–45 mm long, and has several flowers on stems 2-2.5 mm long. The flowers are 11–14 mm long with a smooth, radially symmetrical perianth which is uniformly coloured, yellow, red or reddish-brown to purple, black, brown or yellowish brown, with three clear inner and three outer tepals. There are three stamens on a single level. The filaments are 1-1.2 mm long with anthers 2-2.7 mm long, and not having an appendage. The style is 10–12 mm long. It flowers in October, November, December or January.
